= Scalos =

Widget toolkit and window manager for AmigaOS

- German Scalos on AROS
- Original author(s): Stefan Sommerfield
- Developer(s): Satanic Dreams Software Team
- Initial release: November 1999; 25 years ago
- Stable release: 41.8-rc1 (on Sourceforge) / August 25, 2012; 12 years ago
- Operating system: AmigaOS, MorphOS, AROS
- Platform: Amiga
- Available in: Danish, German, Spanish, French, Italian, Swedish, Czech
- Type: widget toolkit + window manager
- Licence: Open Source (BSD License)
- Website: scalos.noname.fr

Scalos is a desktop replacement for the original Amiga Workbench GUI, based on a subset of APIs and its own front-end window manager of the same name. Scalos is NOT an AmigaOS replacement, although its name suggests otherwise. Its goal is to emulate the real Workbench behaviour, plus integrating additional functionality and an enhanced look. As stated on its website, the name "Scalos" was inspired by the fictional time-accelerated planet Scalos in the Star Trek episode "Wink of an Eye".

== History ==
Scalos is a former commercial product originally written in 1999 by programmer Stefan Sommerfield for a software house called AlienDesign. The purpose was to recreate the mouse-and-click experience on Amiga, offering an alternative to the Workbench interface present in versions 3.0 and 3.1 of AmigaOS (at that time already considered obsolete).

A group of English programmers known as Satanic Dreams Software (a software firm developing for Windows, Macintosh and Linux) took over. The release versions 1.1 and 1.2 (internally versions 39.2) came out in 2000 as freeware. These may be found on the Amiga Aminet official online repository. Scalos was finally open sourced in 2012.

The last release candidate is version 41.8 RC1; it is compatible with AmigaOS 3 for the Motorola 68000 family of processors, with AmigaOS 4 and MorphOS on PowerPC machines, and with AROS, at the moment on computers with processors from Intel 80386 onwards. The Scalos project can be found on SourceForge.

== Versions ==
- v1.0 (V39.201) – November 1999
- v1.1 (V39.212) – 1999 (?)
- v1.2b (39.220) – June 6, 2000
- v1.2d (39.222) – 2000 (latest public beta executable)
- v1.3 (40.7) (beta) – August 2, 2001
- v1.3 (40.22) – September 25, 2002
- v1.4 (40.32) (beta) March 31, 2005
- v1.6 (41.4) – March 27, 2007
- v1.7 (41.5) – August 12, 2007
- (41.6) – March 12, 2009
- (41.7) (beta) – March 15, 2010
- (41.8) (RC1) – August 25, 2012

== Features ==
Scalos is a Workbench-compatible replacement which is declared by its developers 100-percent compatible with the original Amiga interface. It features internal 64-bit arithmetic which allows support for hard disks over 64 GB, and a complete internal multitasking system (each window drawn on the desktop is represented in the system by its own task). It is completely adjustable by the user, and features a system for drawing and managing windows (as in the standard Amiga Intuition system). Each window may have its own background pattern (sporting an optimized pattern routine and scaling) and automatic content-refresh. Menus are editable. Standard Amiga "Palette" and windows "Pattern" preferences have been replaced with new ones. Scalos maintains its own API and its own plug-in system for the benefit of developers who want to create software for Scalos and enhance the system.

Scalos supports as standard icon sets the Amiga NewIcons replacement icons, and the Amiga GlowIcons set on older versions like AmigaOS 3.5, including thumbnail previews of files as icons. It therefore represents a whole Amiga icon system Datatype capable of supporting various types of icons. This includes PNG icons with alpha channel and transparencies, and scalable icons (the aforementioned NewIcons and GlowIcons). Scalos is also fully truecolor-compliant.
