= Aladdin4D =

3D graphics software

- Developers: DiscreetFX LLC & A-EON Technology Ltd
- Stable release: 6.0.0.30 (Internal Beta Release) / January 30, 2014
- Operating system: AmigaOS, Mac OS X, iPad, Linux, AROS, MorphOS, Windows
- Type: 3D computer graphics
- License: Commercial proprietary software
- Website: www.discreetfx.com/Aladdin4D.html

Aladdin4D is a computer program for modeling and rendering three-dimensional graphics and animations, currently running on AmigaOS and macOS platforms. A-EON Technology Ltd owns the rights and develops current and future versions of Aladdin4D for AmigaOS, MorphOS & AROS. All other platforms including macOS, iPadOS, iOS, Linux & Windows are developed by DiscreetFX.

== History ==
Aladdin4D was originally created by Greg Gorby at Adspec Programming in Ohio, and was an updated version of an earlier 3D program called Draw4D Pro, which integrated elements of desktop publishing into its environment. In 1996, the 3D program was then acquired and updated by Nova Design, Inc. Nova Design added many modern features and made it easier to use. It was one of the first 3D animation programs on any platform to employ volumetrics, which were primarily used to create volumetric gas. However, unlike the majority of Amiga 3D programs, it used scanline rendering instead of the more photo-realistic ray tracing technique. Scanline rendering is similar to the rendering technique used in most Pixar movies.

On December 17, 2007, Nova Design sold all inventory, source code and intellectual property rights to DiscreetFX LLC. DiscreetFX is developing a new 6.0 version for Mac OS X, iPad, Android & Linux.

On December 12, 2014, DiscreetFX sold the AmigaOS source code and development rights for Aladdin4D on AmigaOS, MorphOS & AROS platforms to A-EON Technology Ltd. DiscreetFX retains the rights to other non-Amiga platforms.

== Features ==
This software was one of the few 3D applications for AmigaOS, and not just the Amiga platform--in the sense that it uses an OS-compliant GUI, supports RTG displays, utilizes the AmigaGuide Help system and features an ARexx port for scripting. Concerning the 3D features of the application:

- Infinite layering of surfaces: A surface of an object may have a virtually infinite amount of textures, shaders etc. layered on it.
- Spline modelling tool.
- Importing of most postscript files, making the creation of logos easier.
- Unlimited number of working layers: multiple working areas containing only a portion of the scene, easing out the management and pace of objects during the creation of animation.
- Gaseous volumetrics with adjustable mass.
- Built-in particle system to simulate various effects like fireworks.
- Morphing capabilities in the animation system.
- Spline animation controls.

Also, Aladdin4D has rendering features like motion blur, multiple pass supersampling, lens flares, 32-bit color support and a highly optimized 68k rendering engine.

== Format support ==
Aladdin4D supports the following 3D formats: Aladdin 4D, LightWave 3D, GEO, EPS, DEM, Draw4D-Pro and Draw4D, 3D Studio for either loading or loading and saving. Image formats supported for loading and saving: IFF/ILBM (palette mapped and 24-bit formats), JPEG and Video Toaster Framestores. Aladdin 4D was one of the first rendering/animation packages to support video editing/post production hardware on any computer platform (NewTek's Video Toaster/Flyer).

== Interoperability ==
Aladdin4D 5.x supports exchange of data with ImageFX, Amiga Lightwave 3D/Video Toaster, World Construction Set and all programs that support Nova Design's "Magic" protocol for buffer sharing.

== Versions ==
- 1991 Draw4D Pro
- 1992 Aladdin 4D 2.0
- 1993 Aladdin 4D 3.0
- 1995 Aladdin 4D 4.0
- 1997 Aladdin 4D 5.0
- 2011 Aladdin4D 6.0 Internal Beta
- 2014 Aladdin4D 6.0 AROS Stable Release 6.0.0.27 (Internal Beta) / February 2nd, 2014

== See also ==
- Amiga Reflections
- LightWave 3D
- Cinema 4D
- Imagine
- Pixar RenderMan
- Caligari
