= CyberGraphX =

CyberGraphX (pronounced "cybergraphics"), is the standard ReTargetable Graphics API available for the Amiga and compatible systems. It was developed by Thomas Sontowski and Frank Mariak and later adopted by Phase5 for use with their graphics cards. Many other graphics card manufacturers who offered hardware for Amiga and compatible systems used it as well.

== Versions ==
The latest version is CyberGraphX V5 used in MorphOS. Its features include:

- AltiVec accelerated
- Display Data Channel (DDC) and gamma correction support
- Hardware accelerated operations for alpha blending, tinting, gradients, stretching
- PowerPC native, with support for AmigaOS drivers

The original CyberGraphX software for AmigaOS is no longer actively maintained (last version being CyberGraphX V4). CyberGraphX V4 was the last release for that platform so far. AROS implements CyberGraphX V4 compatible API. Alternative RTG APIs are Picasso 96 and Enhanced Graphics System, the first is used in AmigaOS4 and implements the CyberGraphX V4 API with some V5 extensions.

== Dual monitor support ==
- AGP-Radeon + PCI-Radeon: fail
- AGP-Radeon + PCI-Voodoo: ok (Apple Open Firmware only)
- AGP-Voodoo + PCI-Voodoo: unknown
- AGP-Voodoo + PCI-Radeon: ok

Up to 2560×1600 running on Dual-link DVI, for example a Radeon 9650 with 256 MB

== Drivers and libraries ==
Installation window

- cgxsystem.library
- cgxbootpic.library
- cgxdither.library
- cgxvideo.library
- (cybpci.library)
- ddc.library
- cgx3drave.library
- cgxmpeg.library
