= MagicWB =

Workbench enhancer for AmigaOS

- MagicWB preview screenshot used to market the package
- Developer: Martin Huttenloher
- Release: June 27, 1992; 34 years ago
- Stable release: 2.1p / June 8, 1997
- Operating system: AmigaOS
- Platform: Amiga
- Licence: Shareware
- Website: www.sasg.com/mwb/

MagicWB is a third-party Workbench enhancer for AmigaOS. It was developed in 1992-1997 by Martin Huttenloher.

== History ==
The idea to enhance Workbench arose when the author got bored with the gray and abstract icons provided by Commodore. The original Amiga icons could use only four colours and even those were scarcely used. The background patterns supplied with the operating system for Workbench were also minimal. Desire to develop a complete package to enhance Workbench look with a complete set of icons, background patterns, and new fonts was born.

== Features ==
The original Amiga icon sets supported only four colours. MagicWB extended the palette of icons to 8 colours allowing more colourful icons. MagicWB grew so popular that it became the de facto standard for many major third party packages developed for Amiga. One of those is MUI which used the MagicWB palette extensively in its GUI widget library.

	MagicWB palette							
Colour								
Red	149	000	255	59	123	175	170	255
Green	149	000	255	103	123	175	144	169
Blue	149	000	255	162	123	175	124	151

The design style in MagicWB was XEN. The package includes 9 replacement fonts (Topaz, XEN and Courier) and new background patterns for the Workbench desktop.

== Other Workbench enhancers ==
The MagicWB package grew popular but many users found limiting icon sets to 8 fixed colours too limiting. Competing Workbench enhancer, NewIcons, was developed to allow more colourful icons. This eventually led to GlowIcons and finally to true colour PNG icons.
