= Amiga Reflections =

3D modeling and rendering software for Amiga

- Reflections 2.0 cover (1992)
- Developer: Carsten Fuchs/MSPI
- Initial release: 1989; 37 years ago (as a book plus floppy disk)
- Operating system: AmigaOS, Windows
- Type: 3D computer graphics
- License: Proprietary

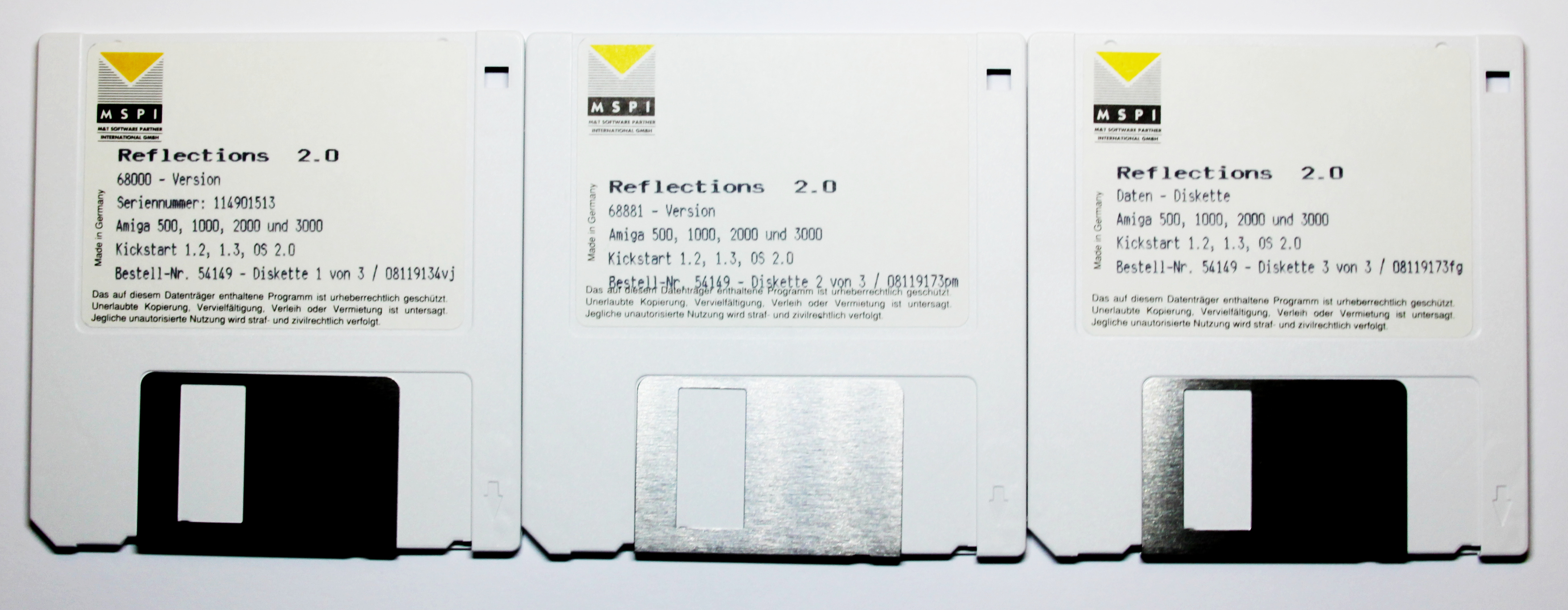
Reflections 2.0 floppy disks

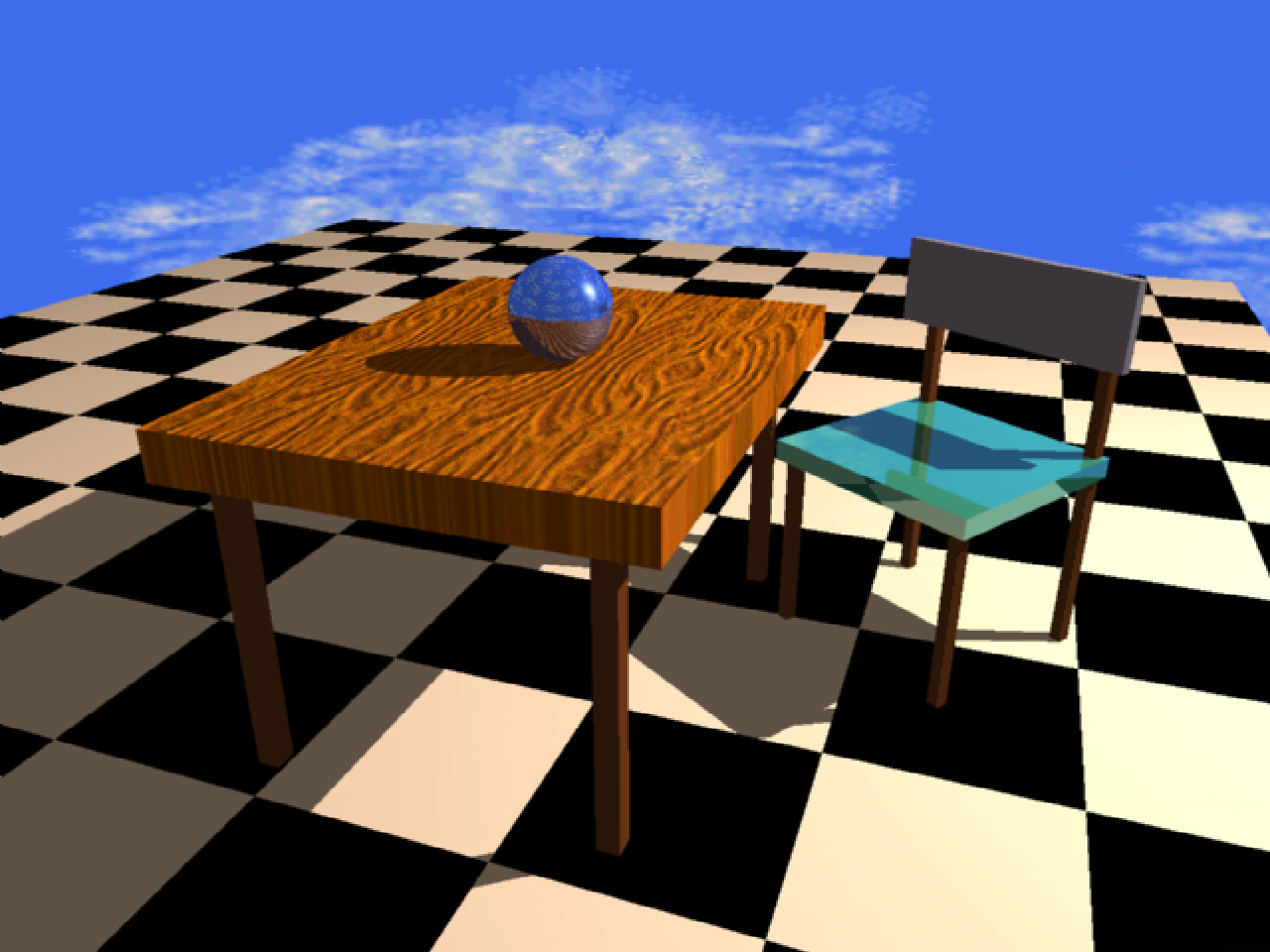
Reflections 2.0 test scene

Rendered with Reflections-Animator

Amiga Reflections is 3D modeling and rendering software developed by Carsten Fuchs for the Amiga. It was later renamed Monzoom.

The first bookware release was 1989, and contained a book and a floppy disk. The book was the manual and had some tutorials explaining how a raytracer works. The floppy contained the software with some models and examples. Carsten Fuchs extended the software with a more advanced modeler and an animation module in 1992, the Reflections-Animator.

The drawback of the improved modeler in Reflections 2.0 was that the program required far more RAM than before, leaving less free space for scene objects. On a 1 MB Amiga, the 2.0 modeler could only handle about 1,000 triangles (or spheres) at most. With 2 MB RAM, up to 10,000 triangles were possible.

As of version 4.3, in 1998, Amiga Reflections was renamed Monzoom or Monzoom 3D and distributed by Oberland Computer.

Monzoom Pro was available on CD with the March/April 2008 issue of the German print magazine Amiga Future. Monzoom also became available for PC as shareware.

== Publications ==
=== Books ===
- Fuchs, Carsten (1992). Amiga Reflections Animator. Haar bei München: Markt-&-Technik-Verlag. ISBN 978-3-87791-166-2.
- Fuchs, Carsten (January 1989). Amiga Reflections. Haar bei München: Markt-&-Technik-Verlag. ISBN 978-3-89090-727-7.

=== Scientific articles ===
Glittenberg, Carl (2004). "Computer-assisted 3D design software for teaching neuro-ophthalmology of the oculomotor system and training new retinal surgery techniques". Proceedings of SPIE. Ophthalmic Technologies XIV. San Jose, CA, USA. pp. 275–285. doi:10.1117/12.555626. - discusses using 3D software, including Reflektions 4.3 (an alternate name for Reflections/Monzoom), to teach ophthalmology and train for retinal surgery.

== See also ==
- Aladdin4D
