= AHI (Amiga) =

AHI (AHI audio system) is a retargetable audio subsystem for AmigaOS, MorphOS and AROS. It was created by Martin Blom in the mid-1990s to allow standardized operating system support for audio hardware other than just the native Amiga sound chip, for example 16-bit sound cards.

AHI offers improved functionality not available through the AmigaOS audio device driver, such as seamless audio playback from a user selected audio device (in applications which supported AHI), standardized functionality for audio recording and efficient software mixing routines for combining multiple sound channels thus overcoming the four channel hardware limit of the original Amiga chipset. It also incorporated a unique mode that produced 14-bit playback using the Amiga chipset by combining two 8-bit channels set at different volumes. The first official release of AHI was in 1996. AHI became a widely supported standard for audio hardware and audio software on Amiga systems and was officially included in later operating system releases.

The author has stated that when referring to this software the correct term is 'AHI audio system' or just 'AHI' and not 'Audio Hardware Interface', term sometimes used by the press.
