= BOOPSI =

Object-oriented programming system for AmigaOS

BOOPSI (Basic Object Oriented Programming System for Intuition) is an object-oriented programming system for AmigaOS. It extends the AmigaOS windowing environment (Intuition) with an object-oriented subsystem allowing a hierarchy of object classes in which every class defines a single GUI widget or interface event.

BOOPSI made it easier for developers to create their own system of widgets and create standardized graphical user interfaces. Magic User Interface and ReAction are examples of complete widget toolkits built on BOOPSI. Both toolkits have become popular with Amiga software programmers to generate and maintain graphical user interfaces.

The object-oriented design brings advantages such as straightforward coupling of objects with other objects. For example, a programmer may link a numerical input field and a sliding control, where if the user adjusts the sliding control the numerical value in the input field changes automatically.

BOOPSI was officially introduced with AmigaOS 2.0 and was further extended in later releases.
