= Retargetable graphics =

Retargetable graphics (abbreviated as RTG) is a device driver API mainly used by third-party graphics hardware to interface with AmigaOS via a set of libraries. The software libraries may include software tools to adjust resolution, screen colors, pointers, and screen modes. It will use available hardware and will not extend the capabilities in any way.

The Amiga OS 3.x intuition.library is limited to 8-bit display depths, but RTG libraries make it possible to handle higher depths such as 24 bits; on Amiga there are two common APIs: Picasso 96 and CyberGraphX, which are almost compatible with each other. Both Picasso 96 and CyberGraphX require at least 4 MB RAM and a 68020 CPU to operate.

== EGS and other early graphics card drivers ==
Commodore planned to introduce retargetable graphics in future version of AmigaOS (4.0), but the company was not able to deliver such solution before its demise. Third-party graphics card manufacturers were thus forced to create their own software layers on top of AmigaOS, incompatible with each other. Most of these early Amiga graphics card drivers shared common limitations: compatibility with current applications was maintained by opening Workbench (or also other application screens, also known as "Workbench emulation") on the graphics card—usually in 16 (under AmigaOS 2.x) or 256 colours (under AmigaOS 3.x); full graphics card features like high-colour (15- or 16-bit) and true-colour (24- or 32-bit) display could be used only by applications directly programmed for such driver software. Earliest of these solutions like Grafexa and SAGE libraries were able to display only their own applications on the graphics card without any support for "Workbench emulation". Examples of other drivers are EGS, Merlin/Domino, Omnibus, Retina (which should be able even to display Workbench in 24 bit colour), Graffity, Picasso, and ProBench. Of these, Picasso offered good compatibility with older applications, because most OS-compliant programs could be promoted to graphics card display, and relatively strong software support. ProBench (by ProDev) was released as a new "Workbench emulator" for the old Merlin graphics card in 1994, and version 3 (1996) introduced 16 bit colour depth and compatibility with CyberGraphX.

Enhanced Graphics System (EGS) was developed by Viona Development using the Cluster language (a Modula-2 derivative) for Piccolo and Spectrum graphics boards, supporting screen depths up to 24 bits. It requires a minimum of 2 MB RAM and 4–5 MB of hard disk space. EGS was first presented with the EGS 110/24 card (GVP) at the World of Commodore/Amiga show in New York in April 1992. It supported a broader range of graphics cards than other drivers and was seen by some Amiga magazines as the next RTG standard for Amiga, but its compatibility with most Amiga applications was limited.

Graphic card	Expansion type	Graphic chip
EGS 110/24	GVP LocalBus	INMOS G364 framebuffer
EGS 28/24	Zorro II / III	Cirrus Logic GD5426
Retina	Zorro II	NCR 77C22E+
Visiona	Zorro II	IMS G300C
Piccolo	Zorro II / III	Cirrus Logic GD5426
Piccolo SD64	Zorro II / III	Cirrus Logic GD5434
Rainbow	Zorro II	
Rainbow II	Zorro II	Analog Devices ADV7120
Rainbow III	Zorro III	Inmos G365

== CyberGraphX ==

CyberGraphX (pronounced "cybergraphics" and often abbreviated as "CGX"), is a retargetable graphics API for the Amiga and compatible computer systems developed by Thomas Sontowski and Frank Mariak and later adopted by Phase5 for use with their graphics cards. Many other graphics card manufacturers that offered hardware for Amiga and compatible systems also used it.

Introduced in 1995 with the CyberVision64 graphics card (Phase5), CyberGraphX was the first RTG software to allow full true-colour screens for Workbench and applications—older solutions supported only 256 colours (e.g. Picasso) or a four-colour Workbench with some 24-bit windows (Retina). CyberGraphX quickly eclipsed all older graphics card drivers and by 1995 was acclaimed as the best solution for displaying Workbench and other applications. Being available free of charge for users of supported cards, it became the de facto RTG standard for Amiga. CyberGraphX V4 was the last release for AmigaOS; MorphOS uses CyberGraphX V5.

=== Supported graphic cards ===
These graphic cards are supported by CyberGraphX:

Graphic card	Expansion type	Graphic chip
3DFX Voodoo3 2000	PCI	Avenger
3DFX Voodoo3 3000		Avenger
3DFX Voodoo3 3500		Avenger
3DFX Voodoo4 4500		Napalm
3DFX Voodoo5 5500		Napalm
A2410		TMS34010
Amiga AGA	Internal PCB	Lisa
ATI Radeon 7000VE		RV100
ATI Radeon 7200		R100
ATI Radeon 7500		RV200
ATI Radeon 8500 LE		R200
ATI Radeon 9000		RV250
ATI Radeon 9000 Pro		RV250
ATI Radeon 9100		R200
ATI Radeon 9100 LE		R200
ATI Radeon 9200 SE		RV280
ATI Radeon 9200		RV280
ATI Radeon 9200 Pro		RV280
ATI Radeon 9250		RV280
ATI Radeon 9600 Pro		RV350
ATI Radeon 9600 XT		RV360
ATI Radeon 9700 Pro		R300
ATI Radeon 9800		R350
ATI Rage 128 Pro		
BlizzardVisionPPC		Permedia 2
CyberVision64/3D	Zorro II/Zorro III	S3 ViRGE
CyberVision64	Zorro III	S3 Trio64
CyberVisionPPC		Permedia 2
DraCo Altais	DracoBus	Symbios Logic 77C32BLT
DraCo Altais Plus	DracoBus	S3 Trio 64 V+
Domino		
PicassoII	Zorro II	Cirrus Logic GD5426
PicassoII+		Cirrus Logic GD5428
PicassoIV	Zorro II/Zorro III	Cirrus Logic GD5446
Piccolo		
Piccolo SD64		Cirrus Logic GD5434
Pixel64		
Retina BLT Z3	Zorro III	Symbios Logic 77C32BLT
Spectrum		
XGI Volari V3XT		
XGI Volari V5		
XGI Volari V5XT		
XGI Volari V8		
SiS 300 / 305		
SiS 315		
SiS 6326		

== Picasso96 ==
Picasso96 is the RTG device driver library set used by the Picasso IV and other graphics boards. Its development was started in 1996 by Village Tronic, and it is compatible with CyberGraphX. Although the first releases were ridden with bugs and stability problems, by version 1.17 most issues with Picasso96 were corrected. Compatibility with CyberGraphX was also improved.

Picasso96 was selected as the RTG standard for AmigaOS 4, at first released as a 68k binary in AmigaOS 4.0 pre-release, with a full PowerPC port following later in 2004 in the next OS update. AmigaOS 4.1 Final Edition (2014) integrated RTG functions directly into graphics.library.

=== Supported graphic cards ===
These graphic cards are supported by the Picasso96 system available for 68K based Amiga systems:

Graphic card	Expansion type	Graphic chip
CyberVisionPPC	Custom/PCI bridge	Permedia2
BlizzardVisionPPC	Custom/PCI bridge	Permedia2
Cybervision64/3D	Zorro II/Zorro III	S3 Virge
Cybervision64	Zorro III	S3 86C764 Trio64
Domino	Zorro II	Tseng Labs ET4000
Merlin	Zorro II/III	Tseng Labs ET4000W32
oMniBus	Zorro II+ISA	Tseng Labs ET4000AX
PicassoII	Zorro II	Cirrus Logic GD5426
PicassoII+	Zorro II	Cirrus Logic GD5428
PicassoIV	Zorro II/Zorro III	Cirrus Logic GD5446
Piccolo	Zorro II/III	Cirrus Logic GD5426
Piccolo SD64	Zorro II/III	Cirrus Logic GD5434
Pixel64	Custom/AteoBus	Cirrus Logic GD5434
GBA PII++	Zorro II	Cirrus Logic GD5434
Altais	Custom/DracoBus	NCR77C32BLT
Retina Z2	Zorro II	NCR77C22E
Retina BLT Z3	Zorro II	NCR77C32BLT
Visiona	Zorro II	INMOS G300
GVP EGS 110	Custom/GVP Combo CPU bus	INMOS G364
EGS 28/24 Spectrum	Zorro II/III	Cirrus Logic GD5426
A2410	Zorro II	TMS34010
RainbowII	Zorro II	ADV7120
FrameMaster	Zorro II	ADV7120
~~UAEgfx~~	Host OS	Emulated
VA2000	Zorro II/Zorro III	Custom/FPGA
ZZ9000	Zorro II/Zorro III	Custom/FPGA
Voodoo Banshee	PCI	3dfx Voodoo Banshee
Voodoo 3	PCI	3dfx Voodoo 3
Voodoo 4/5	PCI	3dfx Voodoo 4/5
Matrox	PCI	MGA2x64, MGA1x64, G100, G200, G400, G450/G550
Radeon	PCI	R100, R200
Mach64	PCI	RageXL with 32bit interface
IndiVision ECSv4	Denise socket	Custom/FPGA
pVision	PCMCIA	Custom/FPGA

=== Supported graphic cards on PPC systems ===
Picasso96 as used by AmigaOS 4 supports also Voodoo 3, Voodoo 4/5, and Radeon R100, R200, R300, R520 (X1000 series), R700 (HD 4000 series), HD 5000 (Evergreen) series, HD 6000 (Northern Islands) series, and HD 7000 (Southern Islands) series. The RadeonHD AmigaOS 4 driver is created and maintained by Hans de Ruiter. Ongoing development of the driver for the AmigaOS platform being exclusively funded and owned by A-EON Technology Ltd.

In 2017, rights on the Picasso96 system for classic 68K Amiga Systems were bought by Individual Computers (iComp). iComp added features such as screen dragging in version 3.0.0 and multi-monitor support in version 3.1.0 (Amiga OCS/ECS/AGA screen and RTG screen active at the same time).

== RTG Master ==
The higher level API was created by Steffen Haeuser for developing 2D and 3D games requiring chunky graphics. RTG Master supports both graphics cards (with CyberGraphX, Picasso II, Picasso96 or EGS compatible drivers) and the Amiga chipset (ECS or AGA). An example of game using RTG Master is Genetic Species.

== See also ==
- AmigaOS graphics
