= Zune (widget toolkit) =

AROS widget toolkit

Zune is an object-oriented GUI toolkit which is part of the AROS (AROS Research Operating System) project and nearly a clone, at both an API and look-and-feel level, of Magic User Interface (MUI), a well-known Amiga shareware product by Stefan Stuntz.

Zune is based on the BOOPSI system, the framework inherited from AmigaOS for object-oriented programming in C. Zune classes don't derive from existing BOOPSI gadget classes; instead, the Notify class (base class of the Zune hierarchy) derives from the BOOPSI root class.

== Wanderer ==
Wanderer is a complete user interface based on the Zune widget set. The desktop is similar in design to the Workbench window manager, but incorporating desktop environment features rather than just window management. Its featureset draws heavily upon the Zune toolkit. It supports theming and various icon formats such as the Amiga planar style (AmigaOS 3.1), Iconcolor (AmigaOS 3.5) and PNG icons. The icons seen in Wanderer by default were designed by Adam Chodorowski, who based them largely upon the GNOME Gorilla icon set
