= Personal Animation Recorder =

PAR, the Personal Animation Recorder, is an analog video playback device for Amiga computers built by DPS (Digital Processing Systems, Canada) in 1993. It fits into an Amiga's Zorro II/III slot available in the Amiga 2000/3000/4000 models. It's capable of PAL or NTSC full-frame realtime or single-frame playback, using dedicated harddiscs connected to the board's IDE controller. Additional devices for the PAR include the DPS AD-3000 (PAL) video capture board, the DPS Personal TBC IV (NTSC) video capture and time-base-corrector board, and the Sunrize AD-516 audio recording and playback board.

== Features ==
Hard drive connected to the board is mounted as the device DDR: in AmigaDOS. The system was compatible with tape backups and could connect to other video equipment such as the Video Toaster and time base correctors (TBCs). This required users to have knowledge of video termination for proper setup. The device utilized Y R/Y B-Y connectors for Betacam recording.

The PAR software provided VCR-like controls for playback, including play, stop, rewind, fast forward, frame advance, frame back, slow play, and loop functions. A drag bar and counters allowed for easy navigation through animations. Key features included:

- Recording to hard drive at 752x480 resolution
- Compression of frames to 24-bit color
- Conversion of ANIM files to individual frames
- Ability to set frame ranges for conversion
- Renaming, moving, joining, and splitting of animation files
- Frame replacement, deletion, and appending
- Playback speed adjustment from 29 to 0.12 fps
- Forward, backward, and ping-pong playback modes
- Automatic Q-factor adjustment for compression

The PAR could record approximately 3-5 minutes of video or 10,000 frames on a single 540 MB IDE hard drive. It played animations at 30 fps and utilized a compression method similar to MPEG, though it reportedly outperformed MPEG results of the time. The system allowed users to adjust the Q-factor for compression, with higher values recommended for 3D animations.

== Comparison to Other Systems ==
Unlike alternatives such as DCTV or AGA-based systems, the PAR provided smooth gradations and precise previews of how animations would appear on tape. It was particularly beneficial for complex 3D animations that might render slowly on other systems. While JPEG-based systems offered faster access for tasks like rotoscoping, the PAR utilized board resources for conversion, allowing image processing software to run simultaneously.

== Reviews ==
In a review for Amiga World magazine, Geoffrey Williams praised the PAR as an "unmatched marvel" that could potentially end the need for traditional single-frame recording methods. He noted that while installation could be challenging for novices, the editing process was straightforward and the playback quality was exceptional, particularly for Betacam output.

Williams highlighted the device's ability to save animators considerable time and money, describing the animations produced as "gorgeous" with no visible degradation. He recommended the PAR for serious animators, based on its consistent quality and well-designed software.

Review mentioned the limitations of the PAR:

- Slower performance for rotoscoping compared to JPEG-based systems
- Potential playback issues with high Q-factor settings
- Manual Q-factor adjustment required for live video capture
- Complex installation process that might require dealer assistance

Review concluded that the PAR represented a significant advancement in video animation technology for the Amiga platform, offering high-quality output and efficient workflow for professional animators.
