= NewIcons =

Third-party AmigaOS icon handling extension

NewIcons is a third-party extension to the icon handling system for AmigaOS 2 and newer. NewIcons was first invented and developed by the Italian programmer Nicola Salmoria. Subsequent development was done by Eric Sauvageau and Phil Vedovatti.

== History ==
The need for NewIcons arose from the poor overall quality of icons in AmigaOS versions prior to 3.0. While the AmigaOS GUI had been revolutionary when it was first launched in the early 1980s, other operating systems such as Mac OS and Microsoft Windows quickly caught on and started to become more professional-looking. Standard AmigaOS Workbench icons were plain and uninteresting: limited to four colours, having no standard size, and viewed from a straight-on perspective that left them looking two-dimensional.

The aim of NewIcons is to solve all these faults. Unlike a standard Workbench icon, which only includes palette index information and is thus at the mercy of the user's chosen Workbench palette, NewIcons icons natively hold the actual RGB colour information in the icon file itself. A memory-resident program (called a Commodity in Amiga terminology) tries its best to adapt the icon's colours into the current Workbench screen palette. The NewIcons system supported icons sizes up to 93x93 pixels with up to 256 colours.

== Features ==
NewIcons also establishes a standard icon size of 36×40 pixels, similar to those of Mac OS and Windows. The design guidelines recommend icons to be drawn at a more diagonal perspective, thus creating the illusion of three dimensions. The guidelines also strongly encourage the use of Workbench's "image" highlights, where a selected image changes its actual shape when clicked, instead of simply inverting its colours or becoming a darker shade. For example, a computer terminal could have its screen powered up, a pen could write letters on paper, or a robot symbolising a computer game could move around.

NewIcons are relatively large in file size compared to conventional Amiga icons or MagicWB icons. NewIcons encodes the icon data in a 7-bit encoding in ASCII. It stores the colour information as 8-bit data and the image data is encoded in the number of bits needed to address the colour map index.

=== DefIcons ===
NewIcons also includes DefIcons, a package of ready-made icons which aims to provide a default icon image for all files that do not have their own associated icons (provided as .info files in AmigaOS). DefIcons uses a scheme that actually examines the file's contents instead of simply looking at the filename extension to determine the file type. This approach is slower than the file extension system used by Microsoft Windows, but ultimately more accurate; a PNG image file with a .JPG extension will appear with a PNG-specific icon.

== GlowIcons ==
AmigaOS 3.5 introduced GlowIcons icon format and supported NewIcons without need of third-party applications.

The GlowIcons format, based on the more general IFF file format, is the native icon format used in AmigaOS 3.5, 3.9 and 4.0 by Matt Chaput. The major difference to NewIcons is how image data is stored. NewIcons uses inefficient ASCII encoding embedded to the application Tool Type metadata. In GlowIcons system developers extended internal icon definition without need to resort to storing information as Tool Types. The standard icon size is 46×46 pixels with maximum 256 (8-bit) colours and two image states (example: open and closed drawers). The second image state generally uses a glow effect to indicate that the icon is pressed.

Starting with the "Final Update" AmigaOS 4.0 supports 32 bit icon images.

These features were later back-ported so older OS version could also use all icon formats
