= AmigaOS =

Operating system for Amiga computers

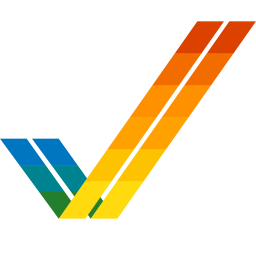

- Screenshot of AmigaOS 4.0
- Developer: Commodore International (v1.0–3.1); Haage & Partner (v3.5–3.9); Hyperion Entertainment (v3.1.4–3.2, v4.0–4.1)
- Written in: Assembly, C, BCPL (v1)
- OS family: Amiga
- Working state: Current
- Source model: Closed source
- Initial release: July 23, 1985; 41 years ago
- Latest release: 4.1 Final Edition Update 3 / October 18, 2025; 12 months ago
- Supported platforms: m68k (v1–v3), PowerPC (v4)
- Kernel type: Microkernel
- Default user interface: Graphical (Workbench)
- License: Proprietary
- Official website: www.amigaos.net

AmigaOS is a family of proprietary native operating systems of the Amiga and AmigaOne personal computers. It was developed first by Commodore International and introduced with the launch of the first Amiga, the Amiga 1000, in 1985. Early versions of AmigaOS required the Motorola 68000 series of 16-bit and 32-bit microprocessors. Later versions, after Commodore's demise, were developed by Haage & Partner (AmigaOS 3.5 and 3.9) and then Hyperion Entertainment (AmigaOS 4.0-4.1). A PowerPC microprocessor is required for the most recent AmigaOS 4-release. Version 4.1 added 64-bit file system support, while the CPU support remains 32-bit.

AmigaOS is a single-user operating system based on a preemptive multitasking kernel, called Exec. It includes an abstraction of the Amiga's hardware, a disk operating system called AmigaDOS, a windowing system API called Intuition, and a desktop environment and file manager called Workbench.

MorphOS and AROS Research Operating System are modern implementations of the original AmigaOS that are compatible with it.

== Legal situation ==
The Amiga intellectual property is fragmented between Amiga Inc., Cloanto (creator of Amiga Forever), and Hyperion Entertainment (the developer of Amiga OS 4.x). The copyrights for works created up to 1993 are owned by Cloanto.

In 2001, Amiga Inc. contracted AmigaOS 4 development to Hyperion Entertainment, and in a settlement in 2009 they granted Hyperion an exclusive, perpetual, worldwide license to AmigaOS 3.1 in order to develop and market AmigaOS 4 and subsequent versions.

in 2019 Amiga Inc. transferred all its IP (including Amiga trademarks and remaining copyrights) to C-A Acquisition Corp., owned by Mike Battilana (director of Cloanto). C-A Acquisition Corp. was later renamed to Amiga Corporation.

In August 2026 Amiga Corporation and Hyperion Entertainment announced that both companies reached a new settlement agreement ending their ongoing legal disputes. Hyperion will continue to develop and market AmigaOS 3.x until December 31, 2027, further development and sales will be then taken over by the Amiga Corporation. Development and marketing of AmigaOS 4.x stays with Hyperion Entertainment along with rights to use several trademarks.

== AmigaOS variants ==
Since the official release of AmigaOS 4 in 2004, there are two concurrently existing variants of the Amiga OS:

=== Amiga equipped with various PowerPC processors ===
The variant of AmigaOS 4 from 2006 and all v4.x follow-up versions developed by the Belgian software company Hyperion Entertainment as official licensed contract-work of Amiga Incorporated at that time, are exclusively for classical Amiga-computer equipped with microprocessor-accelerators, which have to be based upon the PowerPC-architecture only.

So-called Turbo-cards as CPU-accelerators (with just higher-clocking processors of the same original CPU-type, the Amiga originally shipped with) or more advanced variants of Motorola's m68k-line, are not sufficient to run AmigaOS 4, as it in fact needs a PowerPC-based to function. AmigaOS 4 is thus effectively PPC-only.

=== Amiga equipped with various m68k-processors ===
The former OS-line of the classical Amiga OS up until the last official release of Amiga OS v3.1 by Commodore International itself (including the re-release of Amiga OS v3.1 in 1996 by then legal holder of Commodore's copyright, related rights and associated trademarks; the German Escom AG and its daughter company Amiga Technologies GmbH), the licensed commissioned works from German software-company Haage & Partner as AmigaOS 3.5 in 1999 and 3.9 in 2000 respectively, as well as the most recent v3.1.4–3.2 updates of the original main-line by Hyperion Entertainment, are generally exclusively for all former Amiga computers such as the original A1000, A500, A600, A1200, A2000, A2500, A3000(T) or the A4000(T) with their Motorola-based m68k-processors.

AmigaOS 3.5/3.9 from Haage & Partner (Amiga Technologies GmbH), require the Amiga to have at a minimum the Motorola M68(EC)020-processor to be shipped with. This is the case with the Amiga A1200, A3000(/30)/T/UX or the A4000(/040,/030)/T as shipped. Alternatively, the model could come originally equipped with a given original Commodore accelerator-card installed. This is the case with the A2500/20(/30)/UX, or with original yet retro-fitted A2000s, which have the respective accelerator-cards from Commodore (A2620 for the M68020, A2630 for the M68030) within the CPU-slot installed as an CPU-upgrade to the original hardware

Also based upon the original source-code of Commodore's AmigaOS v3.1, the updates of AmigaOS v3.1.4 in 2018 and v3.2 in 2021 also updated the Kickstart was optionally shipped with physical hardware-roms to be installed into the hardware.

The last version of AmigaOS for classic m68k-equipped Amiga-computers, is thus either Amiga 3.5/3.9 from Haage & Partner (with minimum a 68020-CPU) or the updates of the original AmigaOS with v3.1.4/v3.2 by Hyperion Entertainment (which are valid on all m68k-CPUs down to the original MC68000 in the first Amiga A1000).

== Components ==
AmigaOS is a single-user operating system based on a preemptive multitasking kernel, called Exec. AmigaOS provides an abstraction of the Amiga's hardware, a disk operating system called AmigaDOS, a windowing system API called Intuition and a desktop file manager called Workbench.

A command-line interface (CLI), called AmigaShell, is also integrated into the system, though it also is entirely window-based. The CLI and Workbench components share the same privileges. Notably, AmigaOS lacks any built-in memory protection.

AmigaOS is formed from two parts, namely, a firmware component called Kickstart and a software portion usually referred to as Workbench. Up until AmigaOS 3.1, matching versions of Kickstart and Workbench were typically released together. However, since AmigaOS 3.5, the first release after Commodore's demise, only the software component has been updated and the need of Kickstarts being replaced in hardware has been diminished somewhat – Firmware updates may be applied by patching using the Amiga's SetPatch-command, which patches the Kickstart with newer revisions at runtime during system boot. That was until 2018 when Hyperion Entertainment (license holder to AmigaOS 3.1) released AmigaOS 3.1.4 with an updated Kickstart ROM to go with it.

=== Firmware and bootloader ===
Kickstart is the bootstrap firmware, usually stored in ROM. Kickstart contains the code needed to boot standard Amiga hardware and many of the core components of AmigaOS. The function of Kickstart is comparable to the BIOS plus the main operating system kernel in IBM PC compatibles. However, Kickstart provides more functionality available at boot time than would typically be expected on PC, for example, the full windowing environment.

Kickstart contains many core parts of the Amiga's operating system, such as Exec, Intuition, the core of AmigaDOS and functionality to initialize Autoconfig-compliant expansion hardware. Later versions of the Kickstart contained drivers for IDE and SCSI controllers, PC card ports and other built-in hardware.

Upon start-up or reset the Kickstart performs a number of diagnostic and system checks and then initializes the Amiga chipset and some core OS components. It will then examine connected boot devices and attempt to boot from the one with the highest boot priority. If no boot device is present a screen will be displayed asking the user to insert a boot disk, typically a floppy disk.

At start-up Kickstart attempts to boot from a bootable device (typically, a floppy disk or hard disk drive). In the case of a floppy, the system reads the first two sectors of the disk (the bootblock), and executes any boot instructions stored there. Normally this code passes control back to the OS (invoking AmigaDOS and the GUI) and using the disk as the system boot volume. Any such disk, regardless of the other contents of the disk, was referred to as a "boot disk" or "bootable disk". A bootblock could be added to a blank disk by use of the install command. Some games and demos on floppy disk used custom bootblocks, which allowed them to take over the boot sequence and manage the Amiga's hardware without AmigaOS.

The bootblock became an obvious target for virus writers. Some games or demos that used a custom bootblock would not work if infected with a bootblock virus, as the code of the virus replaced the original. The first such virus was the SCA virus. Anti-virus attempts included custom bootblocks. These amended bootblock advertised the presence of the virus checker while checking the system for tell-tale signs of memory-resident viruses and then passed control back to the system. Unfortunately these could not be used on disks that already relied on a custom bootblock, but did alert users to potential trouble. Several of them also replicated themselves across other disks, becoming little more than viruses in their own right.

=== Kernel ===
The Macintosh should have had multitasking. I can't stress enough what a big contribution it makes to the elegant design of system software. The Amiga has an excellent multitasking system, and I think it will have twice the product life of the Macintosh because of it.

— Adam Brooks Webber, the programmer responsible for porting TrueBASIC to the Amiga and Macintosh, Byte, September 1986

Exec is the multi-tasking kernel of AmigaOS. Exec provides functionality for multi-tasking, memory allocation, interrupt handling and handling of dynamic shared libraries. It acts as a scheduler for tasks running on the system, providing pre-emptive multitasking with prioritized round-robin scheduling. Exec also provides access to other libraries and high-level inter-process communication via message passing. Other comparable microkernels have had performance problems because of the need to copy messages between address spaces. Since the Amiga has only one address space, Exec message passing is quite efficient.

=== AmigaDOS ===
AmigaDOS' provides the disk operating system portion of the AmigaOS. This includes file systems, file and directory manipulation, the command-line interface, file redirection, console windows, and so on. Its interfaces offer facilities such as command redirection, piping, scripting with structured programming primitives, and a system of global and local variables.

In AmigaOS 1.x, the AmigaDOS portion was based on TRIPOS, which is written in BCPL. Interfacing with it from other languages proved a difficult and error-prone task, and the port of TRIPOS was not very efficient.

From AmigaOS 2.x onwards, AmigaDOS was rewritten in C and Assembler, retaining 1.x BCPL program compatibility, and it incorporated parts of the third-party AmigaDOS Resource Project (ARP), which had already written replacements for many of the BCPL utilities and interfaces.

ARP also provided one of the first standardized file requesters for the Amiga, and introduced the use of more friendly UNIX-style wildcard (globbing) functions in command-line parameters. Other innovations were an improvement in the range of date formats accepted by commands and the facility to make a command resident, so that it only needs to be loaded into memory once and remains in memory to reduce the cost of loading in subsequent uses.

In AmigaOS 4.0, the DOS abandoned the BCPL legacy completely and, starting from AmigaOS 4.1, it has been rewritten with full 64-bit file system support.

File extensions are often used in AmigaOS, but they are not mandatory and they are not handled specially by the DOS, being instead just a conventional part of the file names. Executable programs are recognized using a magic number.

=== Graphical user interface ===
The native Amiga windowing system is called Intuition, which handles input from the keyboard and mouse and rendering of screens, windows and widgets.

Prior to AmigaOS 2.0, there was no standardized look and feel, application developers had to write their own non-standard widgets. Commodore added the GadTools library and BOOPSI in AmigaOS 2.0, both of which provided standardized widgets. Commodore also published the Amiga User Interface Style Guide, which explained how applications should be laid out for consistency. Stefan Stuntz created a popular third-party widget library, based on BOOPSI, called Magic User Interface, or MUI. MorphOS uses MUI as its official toolkit, while AROS uses a MUI clone called Zune. AmigaOS 3.5 added another widget set, ReAction, also based on BOOPSI.

An unusual feature of AmigaOS is the use of multiple screens shown on the same display. Each screen may have a different video resolution or color depth. AmigaOS 2.0 added support for public screens, allowing applications to open windows on other applications' screens. Prior to AmigaOS 2.0, only the Workbench screen was shared. A widget in the top-right corner of every screen allows screens to be cycled through. Screens can be overlaid by dragging each up or down by their title bars. AmigaOS 4 introduced screens that are draggable in any direction.

=== File manager ===
Workbench is the native graphical file manager and desktop environment of AmigaOS. Though the term Workbench was originally used by users to refer to the entire operating system, with the release of AmigaOS 3.1 the operating system was renamed AmigaOS and subsequently Workbench refers to the desktop manager only. As the name suggests, the metaphor of a workbench is used, rather than that of a desktop; directories are depicted as drawers, executable files are tools, data files are projects and GUI widgets are gadgets. In many other aspects the interface resembles Mac OS, with the main desktop showing icons of inserted disks and hard drive partitions, and a single menu bar at the top of every screen. Unlike the Macintosh mouse available at the time, the standard Amiga mouse has two buttons – the right mouse button operates the pull-down menus, with a "release to select" mechanism.

== Features ==
=== Graphics ===
Until the release of version 3, AmigaOS only natively supported the native Amiga graphics chipset, via graphics.library, which provides an API for geometric primitives, raster graphic operations and handling of sprites. As this API could be bypassed, some developers chose to avoid OS functionality for rendering and directly program the underlying hardware for gains in efficiency.

Third-party graphics cards were initially supported via proprietary unofficial solutions. A later solution where AmigaOS could directly support any graphics system, was termed retargetable graphics (RTG). With AmigaOS 3.5, some RTG systems were bundled with the OS, allowing the use of common hardware cards other than the native Amiga chipsets. The main RTG systems are CyberGraphX, Picasso 96 and EGS. Some vector graphic libraries, like Cairo and Anti-Grain Geometry, are also available. Modern systems can use cross-platform SDL (simple DirectMedia Layer) engine for games and other multimedia programs.

The Amiga did not have any inbuilt 3D graphics capability, and so had no standard 3D graphics API. Later, graphics card manufacturers and third-party developers provided their own standards, which included MiniGL, Warp3D, StormMesa (agl.library) and CyberGL.

The Amiga was launched at a time when there was little support for 3D graphics libraries to enhance desktop GUIs and computer rendering capabilities. However, the Amiga became one of the first widespread 3D development platforms. VideoScape 3D was one of the earliest 3D rendering and animation systems, and Silver/TurboSilver was one of the first ray-tracing 3D programs. Then Amiga boasted many influential applications in 3D software, such as Imagine, maxon's Cinema 4D, Realsoft 3D, VistaPro, Aladdin 4D and NewTek's Lightwave (used to render movies and television shows like Babylon 5).

Likewise, while the Amiga is well known for its ability to easily genlock with video, it has no built-in video capture interface. The Amiga supported a vast number of third-party interfaces for video capture from American and European manufacturers. There were internal and external hardware solutions, called frame-grabbers, for capturing individual or sequences of video frames, including: Newtronic Videon, Newtek DigiView, Graffiti external 24-bit framebuffer, the Digilab, the Videocruncher, Firecracker 24, Vidi Amiga 12, Vidi Amiga 24-bit and 24RT (Real Time), Newtek Video Toaster, GVP Impact Vision IV24, MacroSystem VLab Motion and VLab PAR, DPS PAR (Personal Animation Recorder), VHI (Video Hardware Interface) by IOSPIRIT GmbH, DVE-10, etc. Some solutions were hardware plug-ins for Amiga graphics cards like the Merlin XCalibur module, or the DV module built for the Amiga clone Draco from the German firm Macrosystem. Modern PCI bus TV expansion cards and their capture interfaces are supported through tv.library by Elbox Computer and tvcard.library by Guido Mersmann.

Following modern trends in evolution of graphical interfaces, AmigaOS 4.1 uses the 3D hardware-accelerated Porter-Duff image composition engine.

=== Audio ===
Prior to version 3.5, AmigaOS only officially supported the Amiga's native sound chip, via audio.device. This facilitates playback of sound samples on four DMA-driven 8-bit PCM sound channels (two left and two right audio channels). The only supported hardware sample format is signed linear 8-bit two's complement (each channel with 6-bit volume control, and two channels can be combined into one 14-bit channel as a hack, with the top 8 bits on a max volume channel, and low 6 bits on a channel set to lowest volume; later versions of the OS support such 14-bit audio; the original Amiga has this hardware capability and AHI, version 4, for AmigaOS 2.04, and AHI got integrated into AmigaOS version 3.5 as standard, and it also supports 16-bit 3rd party audio hardware).

Support for third-party audio cards was vendor-dependent, until the creation and adoption of AHI as a de facto standard. AHI offers improved functionality, such as seamless audio playback from a user-selected audio device, standardized functionality for audio recording and efficient software mixing routines for combining multiple sound channels, thus overcoming the four-channel hardware limit of the original Amiga chipset. AHI can be installed separately on AmigaOS v2.0 and later.

AmigaOS itself did not support MIDI until version 3.1, when Roger Dannenberg's camd.library was adapted as the standard MIDI API. Commodore's version of camd.library also included a built-in driver for the serial port. The later open source version of camd.library by Kjetil Matheussen did not provide a built-in driver for the serial port, but provided an external driver instead.

Example of speech synthesis with the included Say utility in Workbench 1.3

AmigaOS was one of the first operating systems to feature speech synthesis with software developed by SoftVoice, Inc., which allowed text-to-speech conversion of American English. This had three main components: narrator.device, which modulates the phonemes used in American English, translator.library, which translates English text to American English phonemes using a set of rules, and a high-level SPEAK: handler, which allows command-line users to redirect text output to speech. A utility called Say was included with the OS, which allowed text-to-speech synthesis with some control of voice and speech parameters. A demo was also included with AmigaBASIC programming examples. Speech synthesis was occasionally used in third-party programs, particularly educational software. For example, the word processors Prowrite and Excellence! could read out documents using the synthesizer. These speech synthesis components remained largely unchanged in later OS releases and Commodore eventually removed speech synthesis support from AmigaOS 2.1 onward because of licensing restrictions.

Despite the American English limitation of the narrator.device's phonemes, Francesco Devitt developed an unofficial version with multilingual speech synthesis. This made use of an enhanced version of the translator.library which could translate a number of languages into phonemes, given a set of rules for each language.

=== Storage ===
The AmigaOS has a dynamically sized RAM disk, which resizes itself automatically to accommodate its contents. Starting with AmigaOS 2.x, operating system configuration files were loaded into the RAM disk on boot, greatly speeding operating system usage. Other files could be copied to the RAM disk like any standard device for quick modification and retrieval. Also beginning in AmigaOS 2.x, the RAM disk supported file-change notification, which was mostly used to monitor configuration files for changes.

Starting with AmigaOS 1.3, there is also a fixed-capacity recoverable RAM disk, which functions as a standard RAM disk but can maintain its contents on soft restart. It is commonly called the RAD disk after its default device name, and it can be used as a boot disk (with boot sector). Previously, a recoverable RAM disk, commonly called the ASDG RRD or VD0, was introduced in 1987; at first, it was locked to ASDG expansion memory products. Later, the ASDG RRD was added to the Fred Fish series of freeware, shareware, and public domain software (disks 58 and 241).

=== Scripting ===
The AmigaOS has support for the Rexx language, called ARexx (short for "Amiga Rexx"), and is a script language which allows for full OS scripting, similar to AppleScript; intra-application scripting, similar to VBA in Microsoft Office; as well as inter-program communication. Having a single scripting language for any application on the operating system is beneficial to users, instead of having to learn a new language for each application.

Programs can listen on an ARexx port for string messages. These messages can then be interpreted by the program in a similar fashion to a user pushing buttons. For example, an ARexx script run in an e-mail program could save the currently displayed email, invoke an external program which could extract and process information, and then invoke a viewer program. This allows applications to control other applications by sending data back and forth directly with memory handles, instead of saving files to disk and then reloading them.

Since AmigaOS 4, the Python language is included with the operating system.

== Technical overview ==
John C. Dvorak stated in 1996:

The AmigaOS "remains one of the great operating systems of the past 20 years, incorporating a small kernel and tremendous multitasking capabilities the likes of which have only recently been developed in OS/2 and Windows NT. The biggest difference is that the AmigaOS could operate fully and multitask in as little as 250 K of address space. Even today, the OS is only about 1 MB in size. And to this day, there is very little a memory-hogging CD-ROM-loading OS can do the Amiga can't. Tight code — there's nothing like it.
I've had an Amiga for maybe a decade. It's the single most reliable piece of equipment I've ever owned. It's amazing! You can easily understand why so many fanatics are out there wondering why they are alone in their love of the thing. The Amiga continues to inspire a vibrant — albeit cultlike — community, not unlike that which you have with Linux, the Unix clone."

=== Libraries and devices ===
AmigaOS provides a modular set of system functions through dynamically loaded shared libraries, either stored as a file on disk with a ".library" filename extension, or stored in the Kickstart firmware. All library functions are accessed via an indirect jump table, which is a negative offset to the library base pointer. That way, every library function can be patched or hooked at run-time, even if the library is stored in ROM. The core library of AmigaOS is the exec.library (Exec), which provides an interface to functions of the Amiga's microkernel.

Device drivers are also libraries, but they implement a standardized interface. Applications do not usually call devices directly as libraries, but use the exec.library I/O functions to indirectly access them. Like libraries, devices are either files on disk (with the ".device" extension), or stored in the Kickstart ROM.

=== Handlers, AmigaDOS and filesystems ===
The higher-level part of device and resource management is controlled by handlers, which are not libraries, but tasks, and communicate by passing messages. One type of handler is a filesystem handler. The AmigaOS can make use of any filesystem for which a handler has been written, a possibility that has been exploited by programs like CrossDOS and by a few "alternative" file systems to the standard OFS and FFS. These file systems allow one to add new features like journaling or file privileges, which are not found in the standard operating system. Handlers typically expose a device name to the DOS, which can be used to access the peripheral (if any) associated with the handler. As an example of these concepts is the SPEAK: handler which could have text redirected to spoken speech, through the speech synthesis system.

Device names are case insensitive (uppercase by convention) strings followed by a colon. After the colon a specifier can be added, which gives the handler additional information about what is being accessed and how. In the case of filesystem, the specifier usually consists of a path to a file in the filesystem; for other handlers, specifiers usually set characteristics of the desired input/output channel (for the SER: serial port driver, for example, the specifier will contain bit rate, start and stop bits, etc.). Filesystems expose drive names as their device names. For example, DF0: by default refers to the first floppy drive in the system. On many systems DH0: is used to refer to the first hard drive. Filesystems also expose volume names, following the same syntax as device names: these identify the specific medium in the file system-managed drive. If DF0: contains a disk named "Workbench", then Workbench: will be a volume name that can be used to access files in DF0:. If one wanted to access a file named "Bar" located in directory "Foo" of the disk with name "Work" in drive DF0:, one could write "DF0:Foo/Bar" or "Work:Foo/Bar". However, these are not completely equivalent, since when the latter form is used, the system knows that the wanted volume is "Work" and not just any volume in DF0:. Therefore, whenever a requested file on "Work" is being accessed without volume "Work" being present in any drive, it will say something to the effect of: Please insert volume Work in any drive.

Programs often need to access files without knowing their physical location (either the drive or the volume): they only know the "logical path" of the file, i.e. whether the file is a library, a documentation file, a translation of the program's messages, and so on. This is solved in AmigaOS by the use of assigns. An assign follows, again, the same syntax as a device name; however, it already points to a directory inside the filesystem. The place an assign points to can be changed at any time by the user (this behavior is similar to, but nevertheless distinct from, the subst command in MS-DOS, for example). Assigns were also convenient because one logical assign could point to more than one different physical location at the same time, thereby allowing an assign′s contents to expand logically, while still maintaining a separate physical organization. Standard assigns that are generally present in an AmigaOS system include:

- SYS:, which points to the boot drive's root directory.
- C:, which points to a directory containing shell commands. At boot time, this is SYS:C, if it exists, otherwise SYS:. The command path defaults to C: and the current working directory, so putting executables in C: allows them to be executed simply by typing their name.
- DEVS:, which points to a directory containing the system's devices. At boot time, this is SYS:Devs if that directory exists, otherwise SYS:.
- L:, which points to a directory containing AmigaDOS handlers and filesystems. At boot time, this is SYS:L if it exists, otherwise L: is not automatically created.
- LIBS:, which points to a directory containing the system's libraries. At boot time, this is SYS:Libs if that directory exists, otherwise SYS:.
- S:, which points to a directory with scripts, including the startup-sequence which is executed automatically at boot time, if it exists. At boot time, this is SYS:S if it exists, otherwise S: is not automatically created.
- T:, which points to a temporary folder.
- PROGDIR:, a special assign that always points to the directory containing the currently running executable. IFor example, if a user runs "SYS:Tools/Multiview" and "SYS:System/Format", PROGDIR: points at SYS:Tools for Multiview while simultaneously pointing at SYS:System for the Format command. This feature was introduced in Workbench 2.0.

=== Memory paging and a swap partition in later versions ===
AmigaOS 4 introduced new system for allocating RAM and defragmenting it on the fly during system inactivities. It is based on slab allocation method and there is also present a memory pager that arbitrates paging memory and allows the swapping of large portions of physical RAM on mass storage devices as a sort of virtual memory. Co-operative paging was finally implemented in AmigaOS 4.1.

== Versions ==
Since the introduction of AmigaOS in 1985 there have been four major versions and several minor revisions. Up until release 3.1 of the Amiga's operating system, users used Workbench to refer to the entire Amiga operating system. As a consequence Workbench was commonly used to refer to both the operating system and the file manager component. For end users Workbench was often synonymous with AmigaOS. From version 3.1 the OS was renamed "AmigaOS" and pre-3.1 versions were also retroactively referred to as "AmigaOS" (rather than Workbench). Subsequently, "Workbench" refers to the native graphical file manager only.

From its inception, Workbench offered a highly customizable interface. The user could change the aspect of program icons replacing it with newer ones with different color combinations. Users could also take a "snapshot" of icons and windows so the icons will remain on the desktop at coordinates chosen by user and windows will open at the desired size.

=== AmigaOS 1.0 – 1.4 ===
AmigaOS 1.3 (1988)

AmigaOS 1.0 was released with the first Amiga, the Amiga 1000, in 1985. The 1.x versions of AmigaOS by default used a blue and orange color scheme, designed to give high contrast on even the worst of television screens (the colors can be changed by the user). Version 1.1 consists mostly of bug fixes and, like version 1.0, was distributed for the Amiga 1000 only.

The display was highly customizable for the era. The user was free to create and modify system and user icons, which could be of arbitrary size and design and can have two image states to produce a pseudo-animated effect when selected. Users could customize four display colors and choose from two resolutions: 640×200 (or 640×400, interlaced) on NTSC, or 640×256 (or 640×512, interlaced) on PAL systems respectively. In later revisions, the TV or monitor overscan could be adjusted.

Several features were deprecated in later versions. For example, the so-called gauge-meter showing the free space on a file system, was replaced with a display in percentage from AmigaOS 2.0 onwards, before being restored in 3.5. The default "busy" pointer (a comic balloon showing "Zzz...") was replaced with a stopwatch in later versions.

=== AmigaOS 2.0, 2.1 ===
AmigaOS 2.0 was released with the launch of the Amiga 3000 in 1990. Until AmigaOS 2.0 there was no unified look and feel design standard and application developers had to write their own widgets (both buttons and menus) if they wished to enhance the already-meager selection of standard basic widgets provided by Intuition. With AmigaOS 2.0 gadtools.library was created, which provided standard widget sets. The Amiga User Interface Style Guide, was published which explained how applications should be laid out for consistency. Intuition was improved with BOOPSI (Basic Object Oriented Programming System for Intuition) which enhanced the system with an object-oriented interface to define a system of classes in which every class individuates a single widget or describes an interface event. It can be used to program object oriented interfaces into Amiga at any level.

AmigaOS 2.0 also added support for public screens. Instead of the AmigaOS screen being the only shareable screen, applications could create their own named screens to share with other applications.

AmigaOS 2.0 rectified the problem of applications hooking directly into the input-events stream to capture keyboard and mouse movements, sometimes locking up the whole system. AmigaOS 2.0 provided Commodities, a standard interface for modifying or scanning input events. This included a standard method for specifying global "hotkey" key-sequences, and a Commodities Exchange registry for the user to see which commodities were running.

AmigaOS 2.1 introduced AmigaGuide, a simple text-only hypertext markup scheme and browser, for providing online help inside applications. It also introduced Installer, a standard software installation program, driven by a LISP-like scripting language.

AmigaOS 2.1 introduced multi-lingual locale support through locale.library and for the first time AmigaOS was translated to different languages.

=== AmigaOS 3.0, 3.1 ===
Version 3.0 was originally shipped with the Amiga 1200 and Amiga 4000 computers. Version 3.0 added datatypes support which allowed any application that supported datatypes to load any file format supported by datatypes. Workbench could load any background image in any format if the required datatype was installed. A tiny application called Multiview was included that could open and display any supported file. Its capabilities were directly related to the datatypes installed in Devs:Datatypes. The established AmigaGuide hypertext system gained more usability by using document links pointing to media files, for example pictures or sounds, all recognized by the datatypes.

On December 29, 2015, the AmigaOS 3.1 source code leaked online; this was confirmed by the licensee, Hyperion Entertainment.

=== AmigaOS 3.5, 3.9 ===
Around six years after AmigaOS 3.1 was released, following Commodore's demise, Haage & Partner were granted a license to update AmigaOS, which was released in 1999 as a software-only update for existing systems, that ran at least on a 68(EC)020 processor.

The AmigaOS look and feel, though still largely based on the earlier 3.1 release was revised somewhat, with an improved user interface based on ReAction, improved icon rendering and official support for true color backdrops. These releases included support for existing third-party GUI enhancements, such as NewIcons, by integrating these patches into the system. The 3.5 and 3.9 releases included a new set of 256 color icons and a choice of desktop wallpaper. These replaced the default all-metal gray 4/8 color scheme used on AmigaOS from release 2.0 to 3.1.

The 3.9 release of AmigaOS was again developed by Haage&Partner and released in 2000. The main improvements were the introduction of a program start bar called AmiDock, revised user interfaces for system settings and improved utility programs.

=== AmigaOS 3.1.4, 3.2 ===
In September 2018, Hyperion Entertainment released AmigaOS v3.1.4; this is both a software and hardware update for all classic Amigas and in fact updated the Amiga's Kickstarts – It is optionally shipped with given releases of physical hardware-ROMs for the respective older original machines to be installed into and eventually equipped with by the user itself.

Like the previous updates AmigaOS 3.5 and 3.9, it is also largely based on and extends upon the source-code of Commodore's original AmigaOS v3.1. Yet, according to Hyperion Entertainment, AmigaOS v3.1.4, which was "originally intended as a bug-fix release, it also modernizes many system components previously upgraded in OS 3.9". It includes many fixes, modernizes several system components previously already upgraded in OS 3.9, introduces support of larger hard drives (including at bootup), supports the entire line of Motorola 680x0 CPUs up to (and including) the Motorola 68060, and includes a modernized Workbench with a new, optional icon set. Unlike AmigaOS 3.5/3.9, AmigaOS 3.1.4 still supports the Motorola 68000 CPU.

Thus alongside of fixing various former bugs, for the update Hyperion incorporated and thus back-ported many of the features Haage & Partners' Amiga 3.5 and 3.9 already brought to the OS (e.g. → support of large hard-drives, support for long file-names, more advanced CLI/Shell, updated and multi-threaded CrossDOS- and CDFS-integration or PCL and PostScript-support for printers). Amiga OS v3.1.4 additionally also came with newer releases of the Amiga Kickstart-ROMs (either as a digital download in Kickstart-images, or shipped with physical Kickstart-ROMs).

In 2019, AmigaOS 3.1.4.1 was released as a software only update to Amiga 3.1.4 free-of-charge, mainly as a bug fix. In 2020 Hyperion Entertainment released the complete change-notes for v3.1.4, including the changes already made prior on its minor bug-fixing update 3.1.4.1 as a free download, and released its "Locale Extras 45.315", which "includes localization materials for greek, polish and russian languages that require additional system setup to work."

In May 2021, Hyperion Entertainment released AmigaOS 3.2, which includes all features of the previous version (3.1.4.1) and adds several new improvements such as support for ReAction GUI, native management of Amiga Disk File images, a integrated help-system and improved datatypes. In December 2021, an update was released named AmigaOS 3.2.1, with bug fixes and other improvements. A second update, named AmigaOS 3.2.2, was released in March 2023 with more improvements and bug fixes.

=== AmigaOS 4.0, 4.1 ===
This new AmigaOS, called AmigaOS 4.0 has been rewritten to become fully PowerPC compatible. It was initially developed on Cyberstorm PPC, as making it independent of the old Amiga chipsets was nontrivial. Since the fourth Developer Pre-Release Update a new technique was adopted and the screens are draggable in any direction. Drag and drop of Workbench icons between different screens is possible too.

Also in AmigaOS 4.0 were a new version of Amidock, TrueType/OpenType fonts, and a movie player with DivX and MPEG-4 support.

In AmigaOS 4.1, a new Start-up preferences feature was added which replaced the old WBStartup drawer. Additional enhancements were a new icon set to complement higher screen resolutions, new window themes including drop shadows, a new version of AmiDock with true transparency, scalable icons and AmigaOS with auto-update feature.

In October 2022, AmigaOS developer Hyperion Entertainment released an SDK for AmigaOS 4.1.

== Influence on other operating systems ==
AmigaOS and compatibles

AROS Research Operating System (AROS) implements the AmigaOS API in a portable open-source operating system. Although not binary-compatible with AmigaOS (unless running on 68k), users have reported it to be highly source-code-compatible.

MorphOS is a PowerPC native operating system which also runs on some Amiga hardware. It implements AmigaOS API and provides binary compatibility with "OS-friendly" AmigaOS applications (that is, those applications which do not access any native, legacy Amiga hardware directly just as AmigaOS 4.x unless executed on real Amiga models).

pOS was a multiplatform closed-source operating system with source code-level compatibility with existing Amiga software.

BeOS features also a centralized datatype structure similar to MacOS Easy Open after old Amiga developers requested Be to adopt Amiga datatype service. It allows the entire OS to recognize all kinds of files (text, music, videos, documents, etc.) with standard file descriptors. The datatype system provides the entire system and any productivity tools with standard loaders and savers for these files, without the need to embed multiple file-loading capabilities into any single program.

AtheOS was inspired by AmigaOS, and originally intended to be a clone of AmigaOS. Syllable is a fork of AtheOS, and includes some AmigaOS- and BeOS-like qualities.

FriendUP is a cloud based meta operating system. It has many former Commodore and Amiga developers and employees working on the project. The operating system retains several AmigaOS-like features, including DOS Drivers, mount lists, a TRIPOS based CLI and screen dragging.

Finally, the operating system of the 3DO Interactive Multiplayer bore a very strong resemblance to AmigaOS and was developed by RJ Mical, the creator of the Amiga's Intuition user interface.

== See also ==
- Comparison of operating systems
