= Exec (Amiga) =

Kernel of AmigaOS

- Developer: Carl Sassenrath
- OS family: AmigaOS
- Working state: Current
- Source model: Closed source
- Initial release: 23 July 1985; 40 years ago
- Latest release: 4.1 Final Edition Update 2 / 12 January 2021; 4 years ago
- Marketing target: AmigaOS
- Available in: English
- Update method: Compile from source code
- Supported platforms: Amiga Motorola 68000 series (MC680x0, 68k)
- Kernel type: Microkernel
- Default user interface: Command-line interface
- License: Proprietary
- Official website: www.amigaos.net

Exec is the kernel of AmigaOS. It is a 13 KB multitasking microkernel which enabled pre-emptive multitasking in as little as 256 KB of memory (as supplied with the first Amiga 1000s). Exec provided functions for multitasking, memory management, and handling of interrupts and dynamic shared libraries.

It acts as a scheduler for tasks running on the system, providing pre-emptive multitasking with prioritized round-robin scheduling. Exec also provides access to other libraries and high-level inter-process communication via message passing. Other comparable microkernels have had performance problems because of the need to copy messages between address spaces. Since the Amiga has only one address space, Exec message passing is quite efficient. The only fixed memory address in the Amiga software (address 4) is a pointer to exec.library, which can then be used to access other libraries. Exec was designed and implemented by Carl Sassenrath.

== Exec ==
Unlike newer modern operating systems, the exec kernel does not run "privileged". Contemporary operating systems for the Motorola 68000, such as Atari TOS and SunOS used trap instructions to invoke kernel functions. This made the kernel functions run in the 68000's supervisor mode, while user software ran in the unprivileged user mode. By contrast, exec function calls are made with the library jump table, and the kernel code normally executes in user mode. Whenever supervisor mode is needed, either by the kernel or user programs, the library functions Supervisor() or SuperState() are used.

One limit of the Exec kernel was that an uncooperative program could disable multitasking for a long time, or indefinitely, by invoking Exec's calls Forbid() or Disable(), with no later invocation of corresponding Permit() or Enable(), causing the environment to run as one task. Multitasking could also be disabled by programs which, by software bug or intent, modify Exec's data structures or the code stored in random-access memory (RAM), possibly due to lack of memory management unit (MMU) support.

Even with such limits, Exec satisfies the definition of a preemptive kernel, using a preemptive scheduling routine and basing its interrupt intervals on a clock rather than relying on the tasks to initiate a context switch as they do with co-operative multitasking.

Linux kernel developer Linus Torvalds once described the Amiga design as cooperative, even though it uses a preemptive scheduling policy. The reason for that, he argued, was because the lack of [memory] protection between tasks, meant a task could hinder the system from operating preemptively. As tasks would need to choose not to stop the preemptive mechanism this would reduce to a kind of inverted cooperative system. This kind of conflation between protection and scheduler policy is nonstandard.

== ExecSG ==
ExecSG (Second Generation) is the kernel used by AmigaOS 4. This kernel was licensed by Hyperion Entertainment from Thomas Frieden and Hans-Jörg Frieden. It exposes the same functions and structures as the Amiga Exec kernel but runs on PowerPC processors only. The ultimate origin of ExecSG is unspecified.
