= MorphOS =

Amiga-compatible computer operating system

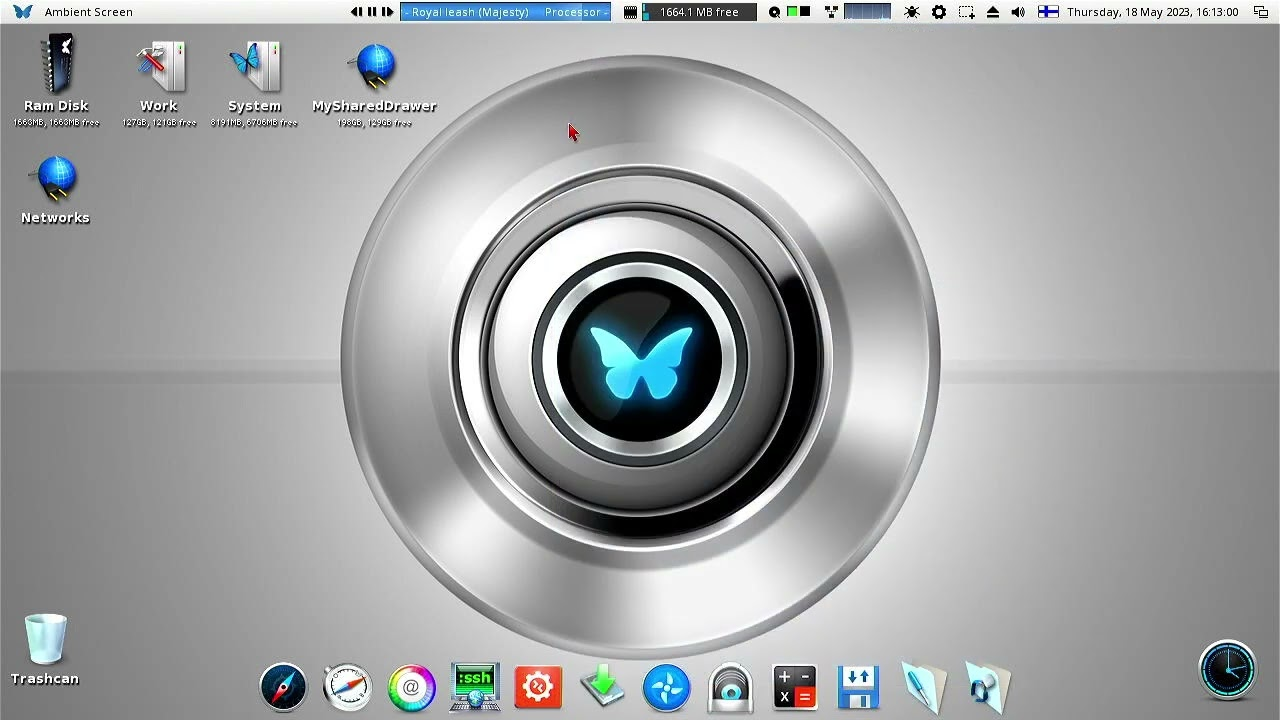
- MorphOS 3.18 showing the Ambient desktop
- Developer: The MorphOS Development Team
- Written in: C, C++, Objective-C++, Pascal, Python, Perl, Amiga E, Ruby, Lua
- OS family: AmigaOS-like
- Working state: Current
- Source model: Closed source (with open source components)
- Initial release: 0.1 / August 1, 2000; 26 years ago
- Latest release: 3.21 / November 7, 2026; 0 days ago
- Available in: 19 languages
- Supported platforms: Pegasos, some models of Amiga, Efika, Mac Mini G4, eMac, Power Mac G4, PowerBook G4, iBook G4, Power Mac G5, SAM 460, AmigaOne X5000, Mirari
- Kernel type: Micro/pico
- Default user interface: Ambient
- License: Proprietary with GNU GPL Ambient user interface
- Official website: www.morphos-team.net

MorphOS is an AmigaOS-like operating system designed for Power and PowerPC based computers. The core, based on the Quark microkernel, is proprietary; however, several libraries and other parts are open source, such as the Ambient desktop.

The project began in 1999. It was produced for the Pegasos computer, as well as PowerUP accelerator equipped Amiga computers, and a series of Freescale development boards that use the Genesi firmware, including the Efika and mobileGT. Since then, MorphOS has been ported to Apple's Mac mini, eMac, Power Mac G4 and limited support for Power Mac G5. It is binary compatible with software written for Motorola 68k-based Amiga computers.

== History ==
Amiga family development tree

The project began in 1999, based on the Quark microkernel. The earliest versions of MorphOS ran only via PPC accelerator cards on the Amiga computers, and required portions of AmigaOS to fully function. A collaborative effort between the companies bPlan (of which the lead MorphOS developer is a partner) and Thendic-France in 2002 resulted in the first regular, non-prototype production of bPlan-engineered Pegasos computers capable of running MorphOS or Linux. Thendic-France had financial problems and folded; however, the collaboration continued under the new banner of "Genesi". A busy promotional year followed in 2003, with appearances at conventions and exhibitions in several places around the world, including the Consumer Electronics Show (CES) in Las Vegas.

After some bitter disagreements within the MorphOS development team in 2003 and 2004, culminating with accusations by a MorphOS developer that he and others had not been paid, the Ambient desktop interface was released under GPL and is now actively developed by the Ambient development team. Subject to GPL rules, Ambient continues to be included in the commercial MorphOS product. An alternative MorphOS desktop system is Scalos.

Beginning with the release of MorphOS 2.0 in 2008, development shifted from its original Pegasos and Amiga PowerUP focus toward broader support for PowerPC-based hardware, particularly Apple Macintosh systems. Subsequent releases added compatibility with the Mac mini G4, eMac, Power Mac G4, PowerBook G4, iBook G4, and selected Power Mac G5 models, significantly expanding the platform's potential user base. During the same period, the operating system gained a native TCP/IP stack, enhanced graphics and multimedia capabilities, improved hardware support, and new desktop applications, reflecting an ongoing effort to modernize the system while maintaining compatibility with classic Amiga software.

== Characteristics and versions ==
Developed for PowerPC central processing units (CPUs) from Freescale and IBM, it also supports the original AmigaOS Motorola 68000 series (68k, MC680x0) applications via proprietary task-based emulation, and most AmigaOS PPC applications via application programming interface (API) wrappers. It is API compatible with AmigaOS 3.1 and has a GUI based on the Magic User Interface (MUI).

Besides the Pegasos version of MorphOS, there is a version for Amiga computers equipped with PowerUP accelerator cards produced by Phase5. This version is free, as is registration. If unregistered, it slows down after each two-hour session. PowerUP MorphOS was most recently updated on 23 February 2006; however, it does not exceed the feature set or advancement of the Pegasos release.

A version of MorphOS for the Efika, a very small mainboard based on the ultra-low-power MPC5200B processor from Freescale, has been shown at exhibitions and user gatherings in Germany. Since the release of 2.0, MorphOS supports Efika.

=== Software ===
MorphOS can run any system friendly Amiga software written for 68k processors. It is also possible to use 68k libraries or datatypes on PPC applications and vice versa. It also provides compatibility layer for PowerUP and WarpUP software written for PowerUP accelerator cards. The largest repository is Aminet with over 75,000 packages online with packages from all Amiga flavors including music, sound, and artwork. MorphOS-only software repositories are hosted at MorphOS software, and MorphOS Storage. MorphOS is delivered with several desktop applications in the form of pre-installed software.

== Components ==
System architecture

=== ABox ===
ABox is an emulation sandbox featuring a PPC native AmigaOS API clone that is binary compatible with 68k Amiga applications, and PowerUP and WarpOS formats of Amiga PPC executables. ABox is based in part on AROS Research Operating System. ABox includes Trance JIT code translator for 68k native Amiga applications.

=== Other ===
- AHI – audio interface: 6.7
- Ambient – the default MorphOS desktop, inspired by Workbench and Directory Opus 5
- CyberGraphX – graphics interface originally developed for Amiga computers: 5.1
- Magic User Interface – primary graphical user interface (GUI) toolkit: 4.2
- Poseidon – the Amiga USB stack developed by Chris Hodges
- TurboPrint – the printing system
- TinyGL – OpenGL implementation and Warp3D compatibility is featured via Rendering Acceleration Virtual Engine (RAVE) low-level API: V 51
- Quark – manages the low level systems and hosts the A/Box currently

=== Ambient ===
Ambient
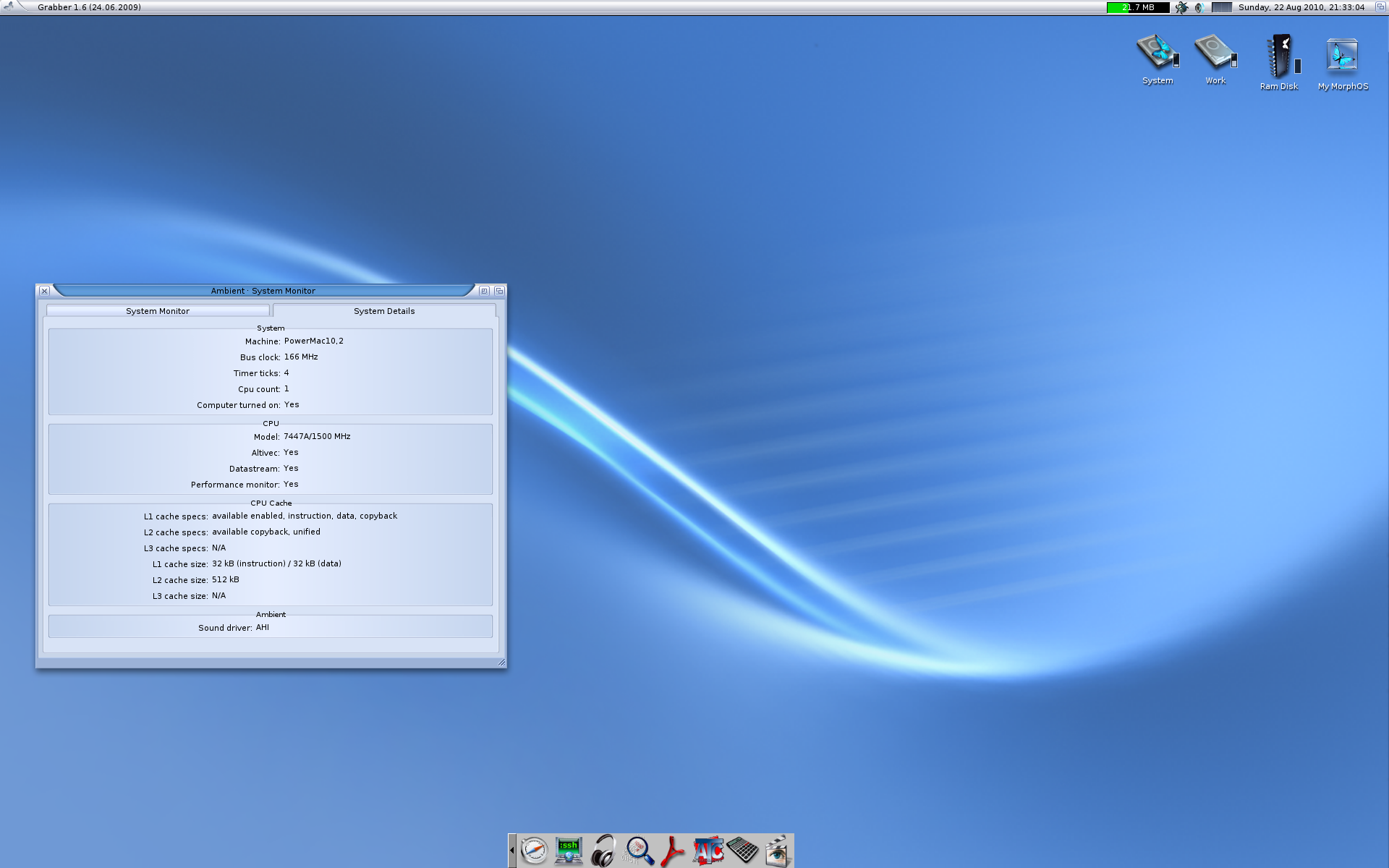
- A screenshot of the desktop with a panel on the bottom
- Original author: David Gerber
- Developer: Ambient Open Source Team
- Release: 2005; 21 years ago
- Stable release: 1.1599 / June 8, 2008; 18 years ago
- Written in: C
- Operating system: MorphOS
- Type: Desktop environment
- License: GNU General Public License
- Website: morphosambient.sf.net

Ambient is the built-in MUI-based desktop environment for MorphOS; development started in 2001 by David Gerber. Its main goals were that it should be fully asynchronous, simple and fast. Ambient remotely resembles Workbench and Directory Opus Magellan trying to mix the best of both systems.

==== Features ====
Ambient does not strictly follow the Amiga Workbench interface paradigm, but many similarities exist: while programs are called tools, program attributes are called tooltypes, data files are projects and directories are drawers.

- support for ARexx scripting language
- default icon library for hundreds of fileformats
- fully asynchronous, multi-threaded design
- fast asynchronous file input/output (I/O) functions and file notifications
- support for PNG and other Amiga icon formats
- built-in icon, workbench and wbstart libraries
- built-in applications like disk formatting and commodities manager
- panels which are used as program launchers

Ambient is localised for various languages; while it is an intrinsic part of MorphOS, it is also available separately. There are various visual effects in Ambient that take advantage of hardware accelerated visual effects within MorphOS.

==== Desktop icons ====
The native icon format in Ambient is PNG, but there is built-in support for other Amiga icon formats. Ambient introduced a special icon format called DataType Icons where the icon is simply any image file renamed to include the .info extension. Those icons are read using the Amiga DataType system.

	Original Amiga icons	MagicWB	NewIcons	GlowIcons	GlowIcons32	DT Icons	PNG	DualPNG	SVG
Colours	4	8	256	256	16M	16M	16M	16M	16M
Alpha blending	No	No	No	No	Yes	Yes	Yes	Yes	Not sure
Icon size	—N/a	—N/a	36×40	46×46	46×46	128×128	128×128	128×128	128×128
Second state image	Yes	Yes	Yes	Yes	Yes	No	No	Yes	No
Embedded metadata	Yes	Yes	Yes	Yes	Yes	No	Yes	Yes	Not sure

==== Development status ====
In 2005, David Gerber released Ambient source code under GPL and it is now developed by the Ambient development team.

== Supported hardware ==
- Max. 1.72 GB RAM; virtual memory is not supported.
- Only Radeon cards have support; Nvidia cards are not supported.

=== Amiga ===
- Amiga 1200 with Blizzard PPC accelerator card
- Amiga 3000 with CyberStorm PPC accelerator card
- Amiga 4000 with CyberStorm PPC accelerator card

=== Apple ===
- Mac mini G4
- eMac
- Power Mac G4
- PowerBook G4 (except for 12" aluminum models)
- iBook G4
- Power Mac G5
- Power Mac G4 Cube
- iMac G5 (only model A1145 – G5 2.1 20" (iSight))

=== Genesi/bPlan GmbH ===
- Efika 5200B
- Pegasos I G3, II G3/G4

=== ACube ===
- ACube Systems Srl company and their Sam460 series mainboards

=== A-Eon Technology ===
- AmigaOne X5000 mainboard

== Version history ==
=== Release history of 0.x/1.x series ===
Version	Release date	Notes
0.1	August 1, 2000	Amiga
0.2	October 17, 2000	Amiga
0.4	February 14, 2001	3rd Release
0.5	May 1, 2001	Amiga
0.8	August 2001	Amiga, Pegasos I
0.9	2002	beta
1.0	14 October 2002	Pegasos I
1.1	December 13, 2002	Pegasos I
1.2	February 9, 2003	Pegasos I
1.3	March 27, 2003	Pegasos I
1.4	August 7, 2003	Pegasos I
1.4.4	March 28, 2005	Pegasos I/II
1.4.5	April 30, 2005	Pegasos I/II
1.4.5	August 25, 2005	Amiga

=== Release history of 2.x/3.x series ===
Version	Release date	Notes
2.0	June 30, 2008	Added support for Efika 5200B platform; native TCP/IP stack, an updated Sputnik release, AltiVec support, alpha compositing 3D layers for the graphical user interface, new USB components (including USB 2.0 support), new screenblankers, and Reggae, a new, modular, streaming multimedia framework
2.1	September 6, 2008	Support for the Efika's audio
2.2	December 20, 2008	TrueCrypt-compatible disk encryption suite
2.3	August 6, 2009	Origyn Web Browser as the default browser, read only HFS+ file system support
2.4	October 12, 2009	Added support for Mac mini G4; write support for Mac HFS disks, new charsets.library to provide better multilingual application support
2.5	June 4, 2010	Added support for eMac G4; drivers for SiI3x1x based 2-port Serial ATA PCI cards
2.6	October 10, 2010	Added support for Power Mac G4; 2D drivers for Rage 128 Pro graphics cards; Released at precisely 10.10.10 10:10
2.7	December 2, 2010	Improving support for Power Mac G4 platforms
3.0	June 8, 2012	Added support for PowerBook G4; performance improvements
3.1	July 8, 2012	Bug-fix release
3.2	May 27, 2013	Added support for further PowerBook G4 models, iBook G4 and Power Mac G5 model A1047; 3D drivers for Radeon R300 based cards, wireless networking via Atheros chipset, major overhaul of TCP/IP stack ("NetStack") – improving networking performance
3.3	September 18, 2013	Fixes support for some iBook G4 models
3.4	December 14, 2013	Improved R300 3D and G5 video playback performance, support for non-native display resolutions on various PowerBook models
3.5	February 15, 2014	Support for PowerMac7,2 Power Mac G5 models
3.6	June 27, 2014	Broadcom Wi-Fi support, AMD R400 support, SMBFS file system, VNC server and a Synergy client
3.7	August 3, 2014	Bug-fix release
3.8	May 15, 2015	Support for Sam 460 series of mainboards; basic drivers for Radeon HD series graphics cards, 4K displays in native resolution
3.9	June 19, 2015	Bug-fix release
3.10	March 25, 2018	Extended hardware support (AmigaOne X5000 mainboard; new SATA controllers, network controllers, scanners and graphics cards), Flow Studio IDE with built-in debugger, support for time zones, new fonts, new themes, vector graphics, including SVG icons, overall bug fixes and performance improvements
3.11	July 6, 2018	Bug-fix release
3.12	October 2, 2019	Dual monitor support for select hardware, improved thermal management for select hardware, new FireWire stack, support for more printers and scanners, upgraded Odyssey browser with HTTP/2 and TLS 1.3 and spell checking support, substantial upgrades and new features to Flow Studio IDE, UTF-8 support in MUI, ObjFW runtime with Automatic Reference Counting
3.13	February 7, 2020	Bug-fix release
3.14	October 4, 2020	Kernel improvements for threading, improved TCP/IP network stack threading support, improved unix emulation layer, Magic User Interface improvements, improved ObjectiveC framework, improved translations for various languages, updated open source components for various libraries and classes, numerous bug fixes. Introduces ScoutNG system monitoring application
3.15	December 31, 2020	Bug-fix release
3.16	March 9, 2022	Added notification system and email client Iris, replaced Odyssey web browser with Wayfarer web browser, added new application switcher. Improvements for Synergy client, added shared openSSL 3 library. Includes hundreds of bug fixes
3.17	May 1, 2022	Bug-fix release
3.18	May 13, 2023	New features: Scriptable Hex/RAM/Disk editor, ArchiveIt archiver/unarchiver application, better cooling information display via Thermals application, Samba2/3 support, including integration with Ambient desktop. Extensive improvements to Radeon drivers and improvements to Realtek 8168 driver support. Issues in USB support for CyrusPlus 5040 systems has been corrected. Many system components and libraries have been bugfixed and improved, including MUI, Netstack and Filesysbox.
3.19	Jan 18, 2025	Bug-fix release
3.20	May 30, 2026	New features: Mirari platform support, SFS2 support, support for more Radeon GPUs, support for timestamps past year 2038. New tools and applications: DriveImager, MirrorBackup, SMARTDoctor, OFHTTP, OFHash, OFDNS, Replace and Automator. Many system components and libraries have been bugfixed and improved.
3.21	Nov 7, 2026	Bug-fix release. Improved Mirari platform support. Introduced BasicWorks office suite with document and spreadsheet authoring capabilities and some new screen blankers.

MorphOS 2 includes a native TCP/IP stack ("Netstack") and a Web browser, Sputnik or Origyn Web Browser. Sputnik was begun under a user community bounty system that also resulted in MOSNet, a free, separate TCP/IP stack for MorphOS 1 users. Sputnik is a port of the KHTML rendering engine, on which WebKit is also based. Sputnik is no longer being developed and was removed from later MorphOS 2 releases.

All TCP/IP stacks

== See also ==
- Amiga
- Amiga Workbench
- APUS (computer)
- AROS Research Operating System (AROS)
- Magic User Interface (MUI)
- Scalos
