= AROS Research Operating System =

Operating system

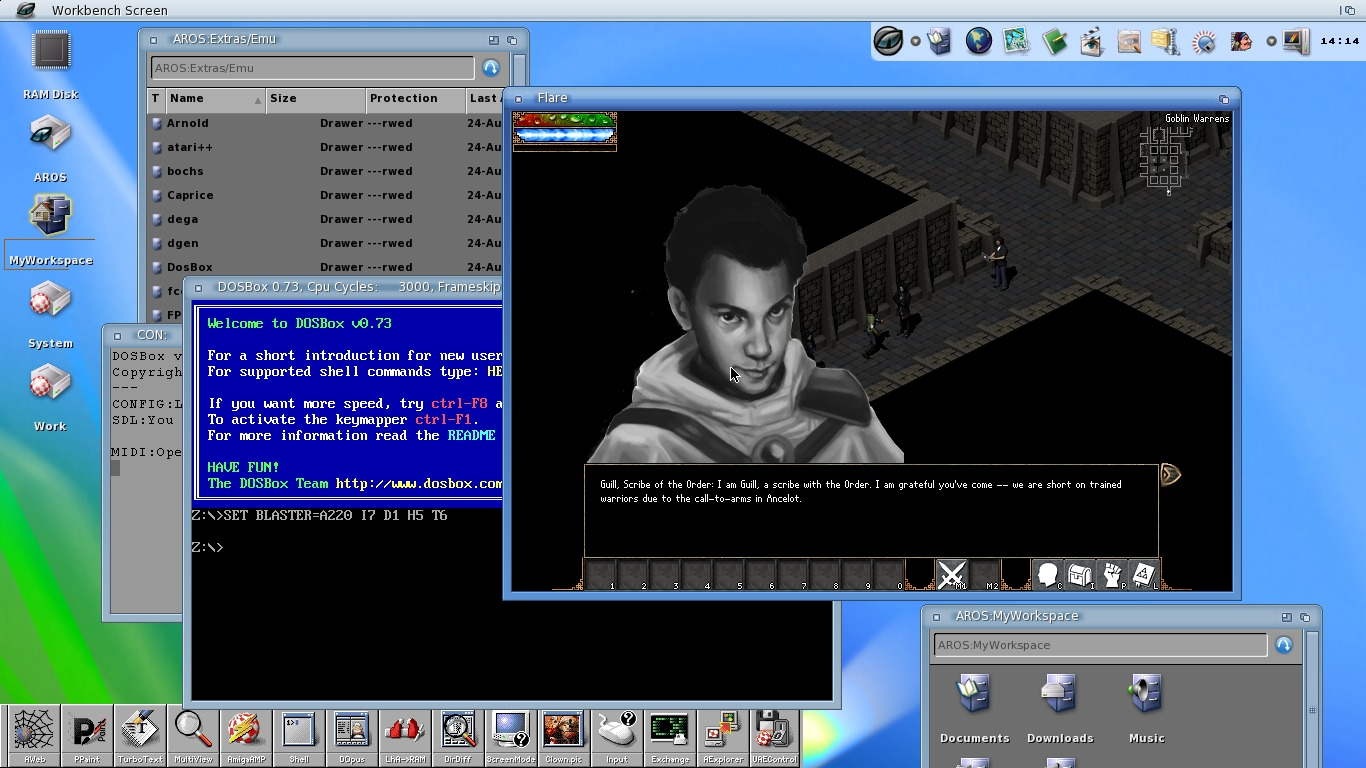
- Icaros (AROS distribution) Desktop 1.3.1 with Amiga 68K integration (August 2011)
- Developer: The AROS Development Team
- OS family: AmigaOS-like
- Working state: Current
- Source model: Open source
- Initial release: 1995; 31 years ago
- Repository: github.com/aros-development-team/AROS
- Supported platforms: IA-32, x86-64, PowerPC, m68k, ARM, AArch64, RISC-V
- Kernel type: Microkernel
- License: AROS Public
- Official website: www.aros.org

AROS Research Operating System (AROS, pronounced "AR-OS") is a free and open-source multi media centric implementation of the AmigaOS 3.1 application programming interface (API) which is designed to be portable and flexible. As of 2021, ports are available for personal computers (PCs) based on x86 and PowerPC, in native and hosted flavors, with other architectures in development. In a show of full circle development, AROS has been ported to the Motorola 68000 series (m68k) based Amiga 1200, and there is also an ARM port for the Raspberry Pi series.

== Name and identity ==
AROS Kitty

AROS originally stood for Amiga Research Operating System, but to avoid any trademark issues with the Amiga name, it was changed to the recursive acronym AROS Research Operating System.

The mascot of AROS is an anthropomorphic cat named Kitty, created by Eric Schwartz and officially adopted by the AROS Team in December 2002.

Used in the core AROS About and installer tools, it was also adopted by several AROS community sites and early distributions.

Other AROS identifiable symbols and logos are based around the cat shape, such as the Icaros logo, which is a stylised cat's eye, or AFA (Aros For Amiga).

== Current status ==
Amiga family/development tree

The project, begun in 1995, has over the years become an almost "feature complete" implementation of AmigaOS – which, as of April 2026, has implemented 82% of amigaOS 3.1's components. This was achieved by the efforts of a currently 9 member team of developers.

Among AROS' milestones include, the complete gnu toolchain and SDL2 having been ported and experimental smp and UEFI support having been added.

It can be installed on most IBM PC compatibles, and features native graphics drivers for video cards such as the GeForce range made by Nvidia. As of May 2007 USB keyboards and mice are also supported. AROS has been ported to the Sam440ep PowerPC board and a first test version for the Efika was released in 2009.

While the OS is still lacking in applications, a few have been ported, including E-UAE, an emulation program that allows m68k-native AmigaOS applications to run. Some AROS-specific applications have also been written. AROS has TCP/IP networking support, and has available an experimental version of AMosaic web browser, for test purposes, among other Internet-related applications. The Poseidon USB stack has been ported to AROS.

AROS is designed to be source-compatible with AmigaOS. On m68k Amiga hardware it is also binary-compatible, so binaries already compiled for AmigaOS 3 can be run on AROS. On x86 IA-32 32-bit platforms Janus-UAE, an enhanced E-UAE, integrates Amiga emulation directly into AROS to run AmigaOS m68k binaries nearly transparent to the user. As of August 2011, original AmigaOS 3 operating system files are needed for the emulation.

The aim of AROS is to remain aloof of the legal and political spats that have plagued other AmigaOS implementations by being independent of hardware and of any central control. The de facto motto of AROS, "No schedule and rocking" both lampoons the infamous words "On Schedule and Rockin" from Amiga, Inc. CEO Bill McEwen, and declares a lack of the formal deadlines.

A workable AmigaOS Kickstart clone for the Motorola 68000 processor was released on March 31, 2011 as part of a programming bounty. The memory requirement is 2 MB Chip RAM and 1 MB Fast RAM. This software is a complete free open-source alternative to AmigaOS.

== Distributions ==
The main AROS system files can be downloaded in many flavors from the project website. These files are compiled straight from the SVN source tree at night time, and are available as nightly builds. Nightlies also include some third party applications to allow people using the system to perform some very basic tasks.

For final/average users, like Linux, there are several distributions available:

=== Icaros Desktop ===
Since April 2009, the name VMWAros has been changed into "Icaros Desktop" to avoid ambiguities with any existing copyrighted virtual machine of any kind. Amiga 68K emulation integration, 3D acceleration for Nvidia cards and latest updates of applications can be found there. The latest version of Icaros Desktop is version 2.3 (released 22 December 2020).

Since November of 2025, the icaros distribution has become unavailable. Its development had slowed down, with no new release in over 5 years until its unofficial discontinuation.

=== Broadway ===
Broadway is a distribution of AROS begun late 2009. The goal is to provide an easy-to-use and complete AROS experience. AROS Broadway contains some commercial software such as a media center, a cloud storage service, and an app store. The latest version is 1.0 preview 5, released April 16, 2016.

=== AspireOS ===
AspireOS is a distribution, begun in 2011, by Nikos Tomatsidis, which is focused on Dell Latitude D520 and Acer Aspire One 110, 150 computers. Latest version is 2.2, codenamed "Obitus", released November 2018.

=== AROS Vision ===
AROS Vision is a native m68k distribution, which can run on both real hardware or in emulators like UAE.

=== ApolloOS ===
ApolloOS is a m68k compatible distribution made for its custom for-retail hardware. Compatible with AmigaOS 3.1.

=== AxRuntime (AxRT) ===
AxRuntime is an AROS-derived tool for developing Amiga-compatible applications in Linux environments. It may work on other Unix-like OSs, depending on library support. It is also reported to work on Windows 10/11 as well, though it was not designed for them. In practice it similar to AROS's own hosted environment, that is, a version of AROS running on Linux.

== Influence on AmigaOS and MorphOS ==
Haage & Partner used small pieces of the AROS source code for AmigaOS 3.5 and 3.9. Large parts of MorphOS (AmigaDOS, Intuition and more) have been ported from AROS.

== System requirements ==
=== x86 ===
- CPU, newer than Intel 80486 (recommended minimum clockspeed of 700 MHz for desktops and 1 GHz for laptops/notebooks/netbooks)
- Floating Point Unit (FPU)
- 256 MB RAM

== See also ==
- Zune (GUI toolkit)
- AmigaOS 4
- Emulator
- Virtual machine
- Porting
- Open-source software
- MorphOS
- List of computing mascots
- Category:Computing mascots
