= Amiga =

Family of personal computers sold by Commodore

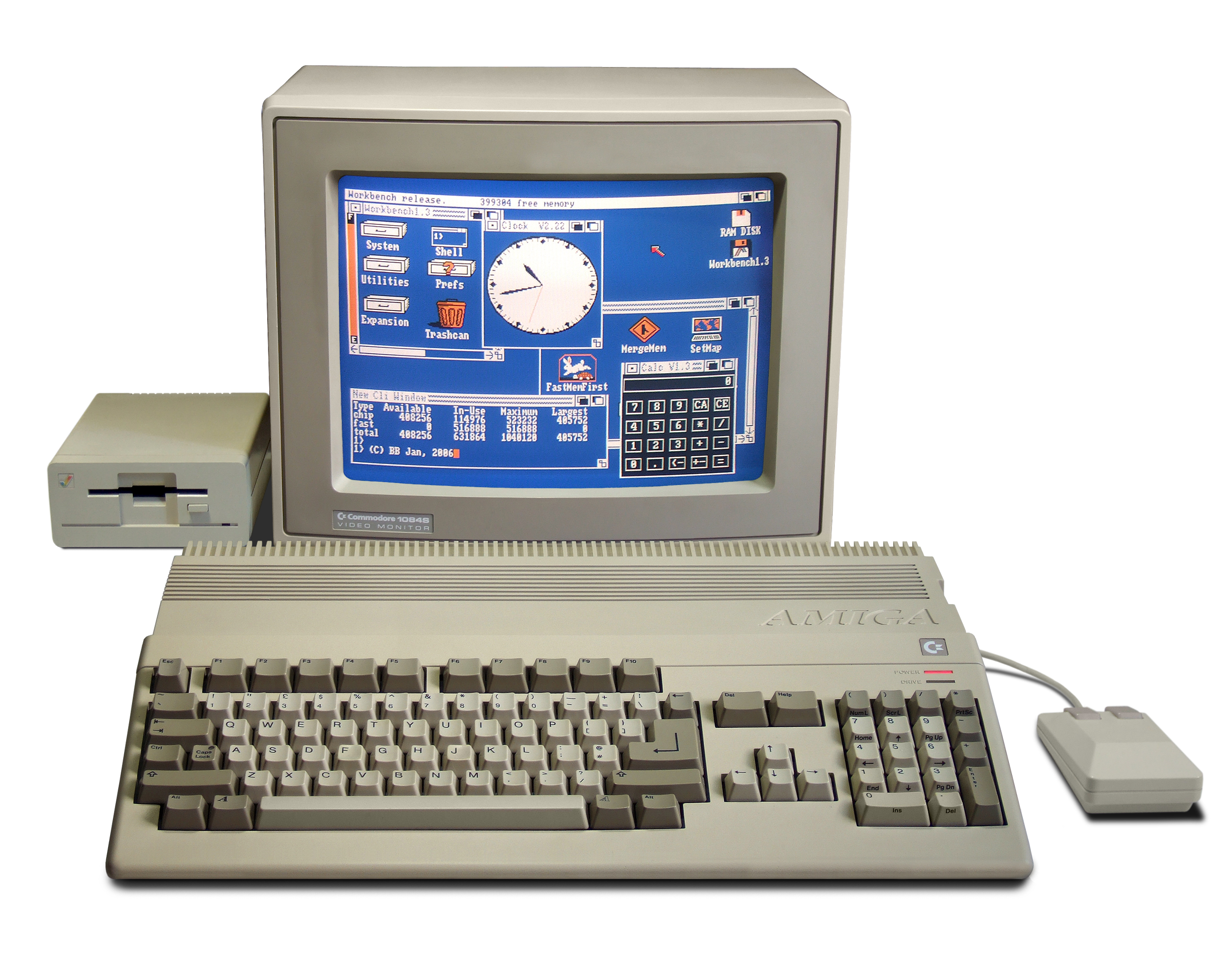
- The 1987 Amiga 500 was the bestselling model.
- Manufacturer: Commodore International (until 1994); Escom AG (1995–1996); QuikPak (–c. 1998)
- Type: Personal computer Home video game console (CD32)
- Released: July 23, 1985; 41 years ago
- Discontinued: 1994 (1996 (Note: After Commodore's bankruptcy, Escom and QuikPak continued production in a much smaller scale))
- Units sold: approx. 4.91 million
- Operating system: AmigaOS on Kickstart
- Predecessor: Commodore 128; Commodore 64

Amiga is a family of personal computers produced by Commodore from 1985 until the company's bankruptcy in 1994, with production by others afterward. When introduced, it was one of a number of mid-1980s computers with 16-bit or 32-bit processors, 256 KB or more of RAM, and mouse-based GUIs. These include the Atari ST—the Amiga's primary competitor—Macintosh, Apple IIGS, and Archimedes. The Amiga differs from its contemporaries through custom hardware to accelerate graphics and sound, including sprites, a blitter, and four channels of sample-based audio. It runs a pre-emptive multitasking operating system called AmigaOS, with a desktop environment called Workbench.

The Amiga 1000, based on the Motorola 68000 microprocessor, was released in July 1985. Production problems kept it from becoming widely available until early 1986. While early advertisements cast the computer as an all-purpose business machine, especially with the Sidecar IBM PC compatibility add-on, the Amiga was most commercially successful as a home computer with a range of video games and creative software. The bestselling model, the Amiga 500, was introduced in 1987 along with the more expandable Amiga 2000. The 1990 Amiga 3000 includes minor updates to the graphics hardware via the Enhanced Chip Set also used in subsequent systems.

The Amiga established a niche in audio and multimedia. The first music tracker was written for the Amiga, and it became a popular platform for music creation. The 3D rendering packages LightWave 3D, Imagine, and Traces (a predecessor to Blender) originated on the system. The 1990 third-party Video Toaster made the Amiga a comparatively low-cost option for video production. Many video games originated on the Amiga before being converted to other platforms, such as Populous (1989) and Lemmings (1991).

The Amiga eventually started losing market share to IBM PC compatibles, which gained 256-color VGA graphics in 1987, and the fourth generation of video game consoles, eventually leading to Commodore's bankruptcy in 1994. Commodore is estimated to have sold nearly five million Amigas. Various groups have since released spiritual successors.

== History ==
=== Concept and early development ===
Jay Miner joined Atari, Inc. in the 1970s and led development of the Atari Video Computer System's graphics and sound chip, the Television Interface Adaptor. When complete, the team began developing a much more sophisticated set of chips, CTIA, ANTIC, and POKEY, that formed the basis of the Atari 8-bit computers.

With the 8-bit line's launch in 1979, the team once again started looking at a next-generation chipset. Nolan Bushnell had sold the company to Warner Communications in 1978, and the new management was much more interested in the existing lines than development of new products that might cut into their sales. Miner wanted to start work with the new Motorola 68000, but management was only interested in another 6502 based system. Miner left the company and, for a time, the industry.

In 1979, Larry Kaplan left Atari and founded Activision. In 1982, Kaplan was approached by a number of investors who wanted to develop a new game platform. Kaplan hired Miner to run the hardware side of the newly formed company, Hi-Toro. The system was code-named Lorraine in keeping with Miner's policy of giving systems female names, in this case, the company president's wife, Lorraine Morse. When Kaplan left the company late in 1982, Miner was promoted to head engineer and the company relaunched as Amiga Corporation.

The Boing Ball

The Amiga hardware was designed by Miner, RJ Mical, and Dale Luck. A breadboard prototype for testing and development was largely completed by late 1983, and shown at the January 1984 Consumer Electronics Show (CES).

A further developed version of the system was demonstrated at the June 1984 CES and shown to many companies in hopes of garnering further funding, but found little interest in a market that was in the final stages of the video game crash of 1983.

In March, Atari expressed a tepid interest in Lorraine for its potential use in a games console or home computer tentatively known as the 1850XLD. The talks were progressing slowly, and Amiga was running out of money. A temporary arrangement in June led to a $500,000 loan from Atari to Amiga to keep the company going. The terms required the loan to be repaid at the end of the month, otherwise Amiga would forfeit the Lorraine design to Atari.

=== Commodore ===
By the end of the video game crash of 1983, Warner was desperate to sell Atari. In January 1984, Jack Tramiel resigned from Commodore, taking some Commodore employees to his new company, Tramel Technology. This included a number of the senior technical staff, who began development of a new 68000-based machine. In June, Tramiel arranged a no-cash deal to take over Atari, reforming Tramel Technology as Atari Corporation.

Commodore was left without a workable path to creating a next-generation home computer, and it offered to fund Amiga development. The two companies were initially arranging a $4 million license agreement before Commodore offered $24 million to purchase Amiga outright.

By late 1984, the prototype breadboard chipset had successfully been turned into integrated circuits, and the system hardware was being readied for production. At this time, the operating system was not ready, and led to a deal to port TRIPOS. TRIPOS was a multitasking system written in BCPL during the 1970s for the PDP-11 minicomputer. This early version was known as AmigaDOS and the GUI as Workbench. The BCPL parts were later rewritten in the C language, and the entire system became AmigaOS.

The system was enclosed in a pizza-box form factor case. A late change was the introduction of vertical supports on either side of the case to provide a "garage" under the main section of the system where the keyboard could be stored.

=== Launch ===
The first model was announced in 1985 as simply "The Amiga from Commodore", later to be retroactively dubbed the Amiga 1000. (Note: The name "Amiga" was chosen because it is the Spanish word for (female) friend, and alphabetically it appears before Apple in lists of computer makers. It originated as a project code-named "Lorraine", therefore the female was used instead of the male and general version Amigo.) They were first offered for sale in August, but by October, only 50 had been built, all of which were used by Commodore. Machines only began to arrive in quantity in mid-November, meaning they missed the Christmas buying rush. By the end of the year, they had sold 35,000 machines, and severe cashflow problems made the company pull out of the January 1986 CES. Bad or entirely missing marketing, forcing the development team to move to the east coast, notorious stability problems and other blunders limited sales in early 1986 to between 10,000 and 15,000 units a month. 120,000 units were reported as having been sold from the machine's launch up to the end of 1986.

=== Later models ===
In late 1985, Thomas Rattigan was promoted to COO of Commodore, and then to CEO in February 1986. He immediately implemented an ambitious plan that covered almost all of the company's operations. Among these was the long-overdue cancellation of the now outdated PET and VIC-20 lines, as well as a variety of poorly selling Commodore 64 offshoots and the Commodore 900 workstation effort.

Another one of the changes was to split the Amiga into two products: a new high-end version of the Amiga aimed at the creative market, and a cost-reduced version that would take over for the Commodore 64 in the low-end market. These new designs were released in 1987 as the Amiga 2000 and Amiga 500, the latter of which went on to widespread success and became their best selling model.

In spite of his successes in making the company profitable and bringing the Amiga line to market, Rattigan was forced out in a power struggle with majority shareholder, Irving Gould. Rattigan was forced to resign Wednesday April 22, 1987. This is widely regarded as the turning point, as further improvements to the Amiga were eroded by rapid improvements in other platforms.

Similar high-end/low-end models would make up the Amiga line for the rest of its history; follow-on designs included the Amiga 3000 in 1990, the Amiga 500 Plus in 1991, the Amiga 600 and the Amiga 4000/Amiga 1200 in 1992. These models incorporated a series of technical upgrades known as the ECS and AGA, which added higher resolution displays among many other improvements and simplifications.

Beginning in 1990, the Amiga overlapped with the European release of the 16-bit Mega Drive, then the Super NES in 1992. Commodore UK's Kelly Sumner did not see Sega or Nintendo as competitors, but instead credited their marketing campaigns which spent over £40 million or $60,000,000 (equivalent to $130,000,000 in 2025) for promoting video games as a whole and thus helping to boost Amiga sales. Some games were released for both 16-bit consoles and the Amiga, such as Chuck Rock and Zool.

=== Sales figures ===
Exact numbers on sold Amiga machines are hard to find. Official business reports by Commodore seldom disclose units shipped. The June 1993 edition of Amiga Format magazine indicated a total of 4,850,000 Amigas were sold. A May 1995 article in The Wall Street Journal reported a total of approximately 5,000,000 Amigas were sold by the end of its lifespan. An investigation launched by YouTuber Stuart Brown estimates the total number of units sold as 4,910,000 machines over its lifetime.

The machines were most popular in the UK and Germany, with about 1.5 million sold in each country, and sales in the high hundreds of thousands in other European nations. The machine was less popular in North America, where an estimated 700,000 were sold. In the United States, the Amiga found a niche with enthusiasts and in vertical markets for video processing and editing. In Europe, it was more broadly popular as a home computer and often used for video games.

=== Bankruptcy and aftermath ===
Commodore shut down the Amiga division on April 26, 1994, and filed for bankruptcy three days later. Commodore's assets were purchased by Escom, a German PC manufacturer, who created the subsidiary company Amiga Technologies. They re-released the A1200 and A4000T, and introduced a new 68060 version of the A4000T. Amiga Technologies researched and developed the Amiga Walker prototype. They presented the machine publicly at CeBit, but Escom went bankrupt in 1996. Some Amigas were still made afterwards for the North American market by QuikPak, a small Pennsylvania-based firm who was the manufacturer of Amigas for Escom.

After a reported sale to VisCorp fell through, a U.S. Wintel PC manufacturer, Gateway 2000, eventually purchased the Amiga branch and technology in 1997. QuikPak attempted but failed to license Amiga from Gateway and build new models. Gateway was then working on a brand new Amiga platform, likely encouraged by a desire to be independent of Microsoft and Intel. However this did not materialize and in 2000, Gateway sold the Amiga brand to Amiga, Inc., without having released any products. Amiga, Inc. licensed the rights to sell hardware using the AmigaOne brand to Eyetech Group and Hyperion Entertainment. In 2019, Amiga, Inc. sold its intellectual property to Amiga Corporation.

== Hardware ==
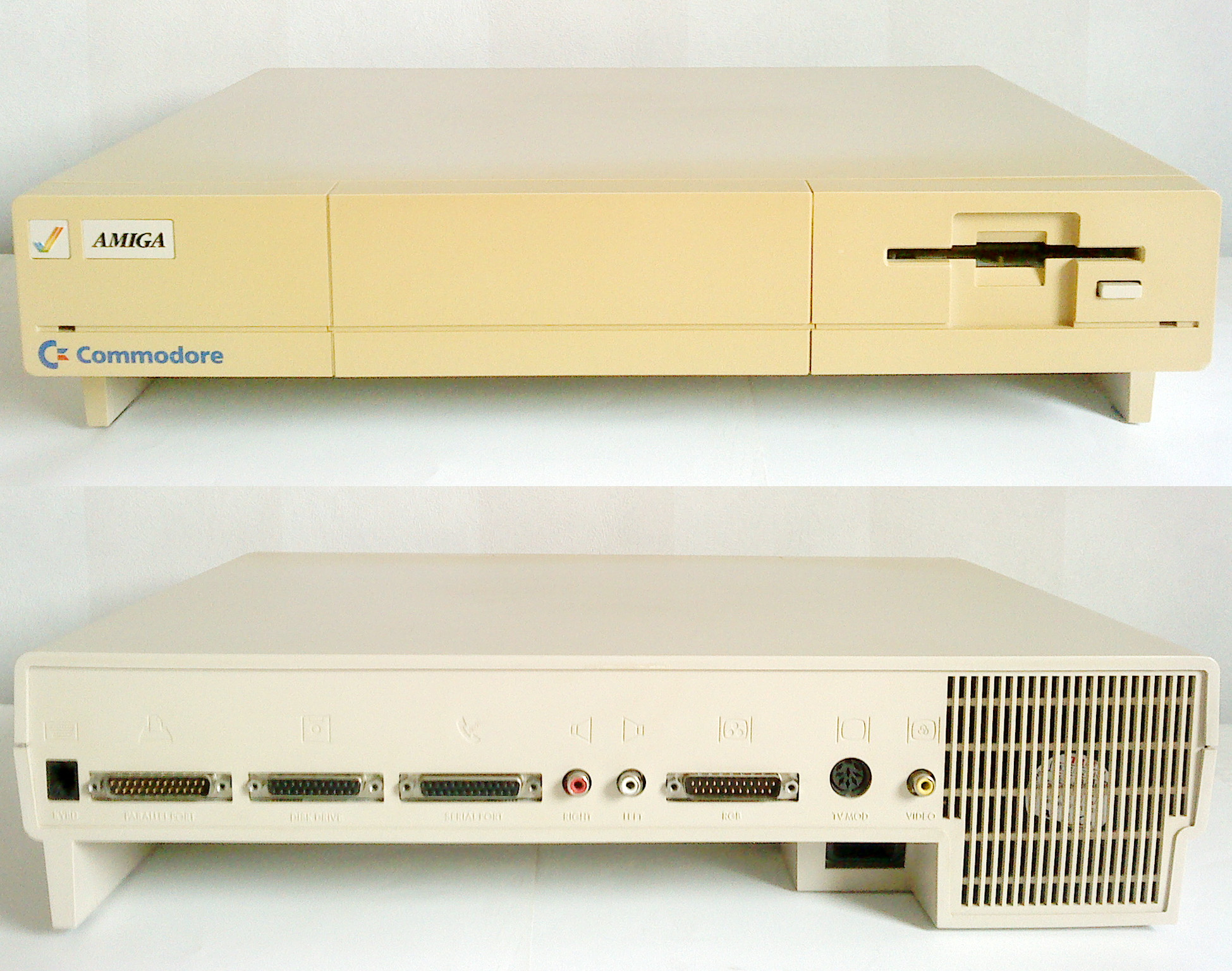
Amiga 1000 front and back

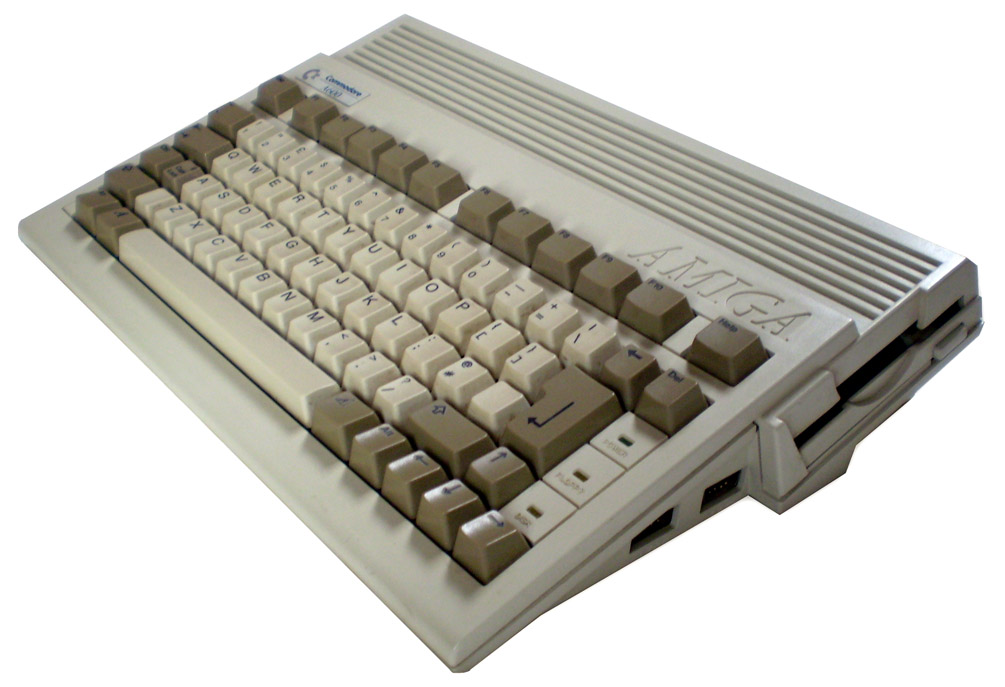
Amiga 600

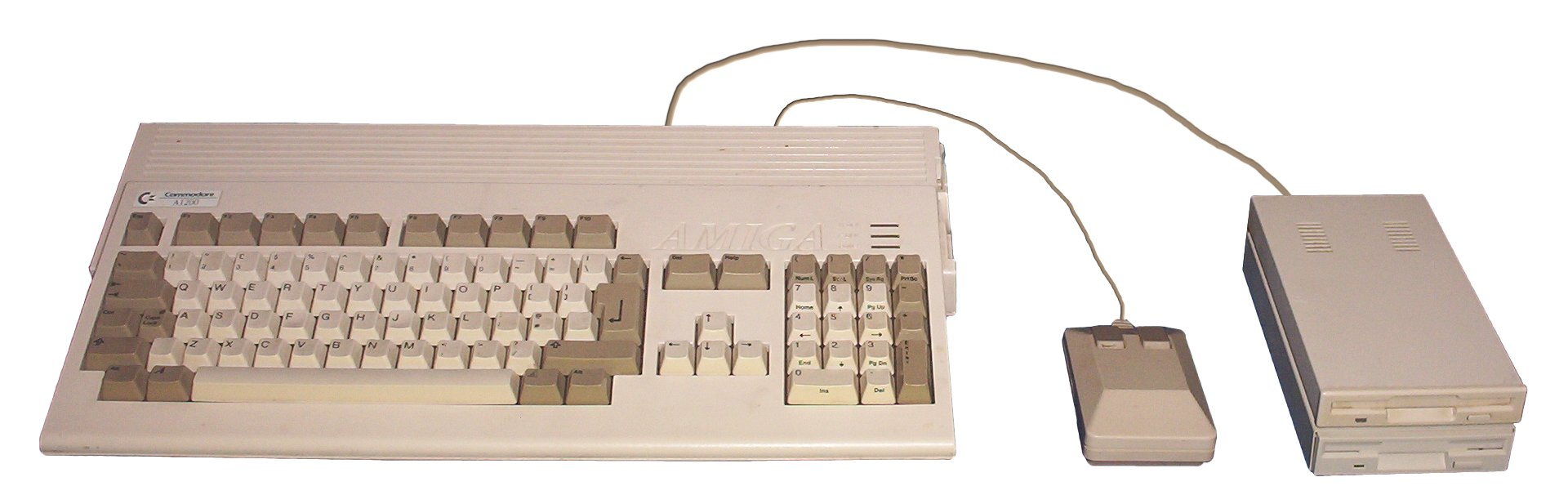
Amiga 1200

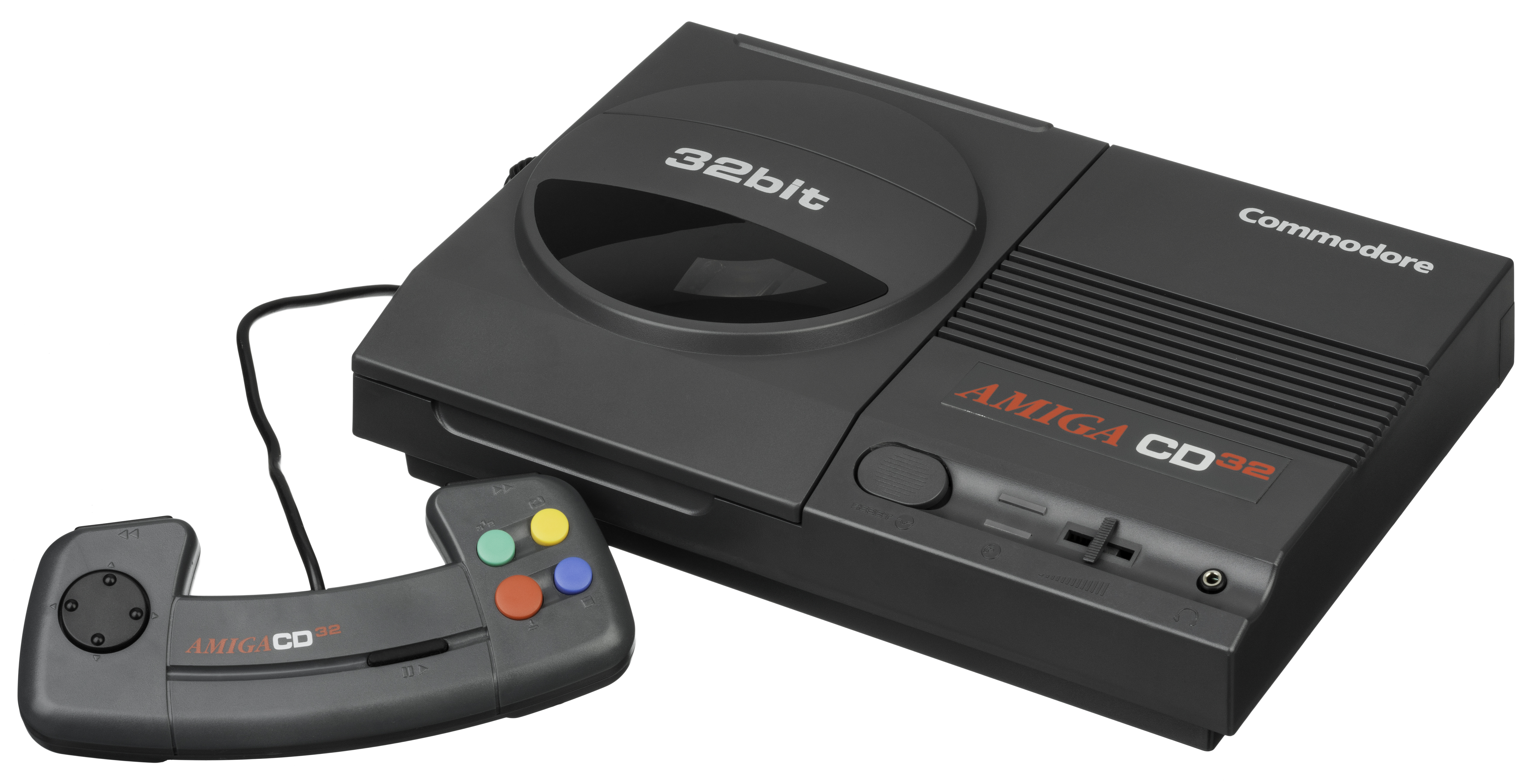
CD32

The Amiga has a custom chipset consisting of several coprocessors which handle audio, video, and direct memory access independently of the central processing unit (CPU). This architecture gave the Amiga a performance edge over its competitors, particularly for graphics-intensive applications and games.

The architecture uses two distinct bus subsystems: the chipset bus and the CPU bus. The chipset bus allows the coprocessors and CPU to address "Chip RAM". The CPU bus provides addressing to conventional RAM, ROM and the Zorro II or Zorro III expansion subsystems. This enables independent operation of the subsystems. The CPU bus can be much faster than the chipset bus. CPU expansion boards may provide additional custom buses. Additionally, "busboards" or "bridgeboards" may provide ISA or PCI buses.

=== Central processing unit ===
The most popular early models from Commodore, including the Amiga 1000, Amiga 500, and Amiga 2000, as well as the later, budget Amiga 600 use the Motorola 68000 as the CPU. From a developer's point of view, the 68000 provides a full suite of 32-bit operations but has a 16-bit external data bus and is implemented using a 16-bit arithmetic logic unit, so 32-bit computations are transparently handled as multiple 16-bit values at a performance cost. Also, while addresses are 32-bit, the chip is limited to 16 MB of physical memory using the lower 24 of the address bits. The later Amiga 2500, Amiga 3000, Amiga 4000 and Amiga 1200 models use fully 32-bit, 68000-compatible processors from Motorola with improved performance and larger addressing capability.

CPU upgrades were offered by both Commodore and third-party manufacturers. Most Amiga models can be upgraded either by direct CPU replacement or through expansion boards. Such boards often included faster and higher capacity memory interfaces and hard disk controllers.

Towards the end of Commodore's time in charge of Amiga development, there were suggestions that Commodore intended to move away from the 68000 series to higher performance RISC processors, such as the PA-RISC. Those ideas were never developed before Commodore filed for bankruptcy. Despite this, third-party manufacturers designed upgrades featuring a combination of 68000 series and PowerPC processors along with a PowerPC native microkernel and software. Later Amiga clones featured PowerPC processors only.

=== Custom chipset ===
The custom chipset at the core of the Amiga design appeared in three distinct generations, with a large degree of backward-compatibility. The Original Chip Set (OCS) appeared with the launch of the A1000 in 1985. OCS was eventually followed by the modestly improved Enhanced Chip Set (ECS) in 1990 and finally by the partly 32-bit Advanced Graphics Architecture (AGA) in 1992. Each chipset consists of several coprocessors that handle graphics acceleration, digital audio, direct memory access and communication between various peripherals (e.g., CPU, memory and floppy disks). In addition, some models featured auxiliary custom chips that performed tasks such as SCSI control and display de-interlacing.

==== Graphics ====
4096 color HAM picture created with Photon Paint in 1989

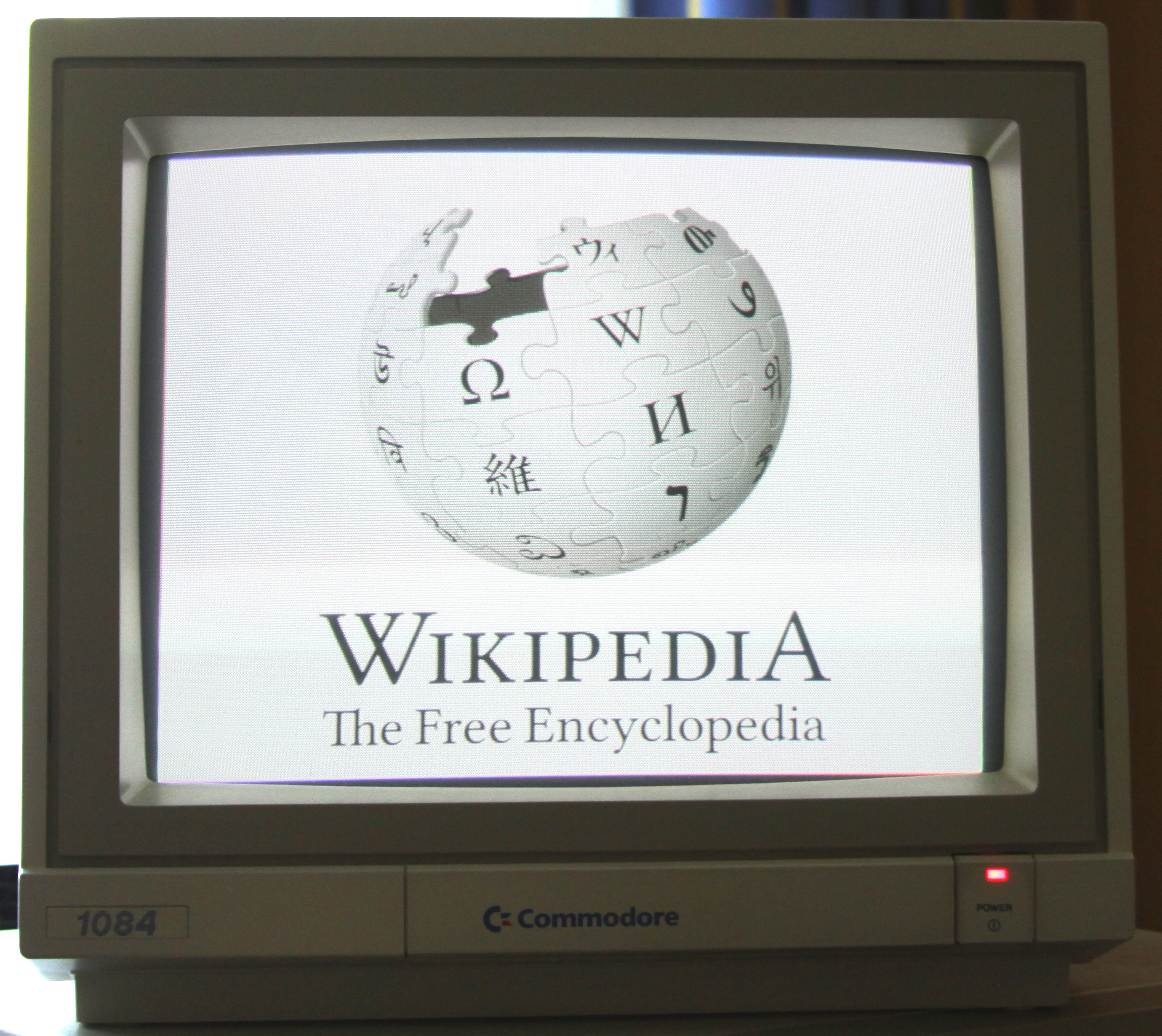
An image in PAL 640x512 16 color mode displayed by an Amiga 2000 on a Commodore 1084 monitor

All Amiga systems can display full-screen animated planar graphics with 2, 4, 8, 16, 32, 64 (EHB Mode), or 4096 colors (HAM Mode). Models with the AGA chipset (A1200 and A4000) also have non-EHB 64, 128, 256, and 262144 (HAM8 Mode) color modes and a palette expanded from 4096 to 16.8 million colors.

The Amiga chipset can genlock, which is the ability to adjust its own screen refresh timing to match an incoming NTSC or PAL video signal. When combined with setting transparency, this allows an Amiga to overlay an external video source with graphics. This ability made the Amiga popular for many applications, and provides the ability to do character generation and CGI effects far more cheaply than earlier systems. This ability has been frequently utilized by wedding videographers, TV stations and their weather forecasting divisions (for weather graphics and radar), advertising channels, music video production, and desktop videographers. The NewTek Video Toaster was made possible by the genlock ability of the Amiga.

In 1988, the release of the Amiga A2024 fixed-frequency monochrome monitor with built-in framebuffer and flicker fixer hardware provided the Amiga with a choice of high-resolution graphic modes (1008×800 for NTSC and 1008×1024 for PAL) with 4 Grayscale levels.

==== ReTargetable Graphics ====
ReTargetable Graphics is an API for device drivers mainly used by 3rd party graphics hardware to interface with AmigaOS via a set of libraries. The software libraries may include software tools to adjust resolution, screen colors, pointers and screen modes. The standard Intuition interface is limited to display depths of 8 bits, while RTG makes it possible to handle higher depths like 24-bits.

==== Sound ====
The sound chip, named Paula, supports four PCM sound channels (two for the left speaker and two for the right) with 8-bit resolution for each channel and a 6-bit volume control per channel. The analog output is connected to a low-pass filter, which filters out high-frequency aliasing when the Amiga is using a lower sampling rate (see Nyquist frequency). The brightness of the Amiga's power LED is used to indicate the status of the Amiga's low-pass filter. The filter is active when the LED is at normal brightness, and deactivated when dimmed (or off on older A500 Amigas). On the Amiga 1000 (and early Amiga 500 and Amiga 2000 models), the power LED had no relation to the filter's status, and a wire needed to be manually soldered between pins on the sound chip to disable the filter. Paula can read arbitrary waveforms at arbitrary rates and amplitudes directly from the system's RAM, using direct memory access (DMA), making sound playback without CPU intervention possible.

Although the hardware is limited to four separate sound channels, software such as OctaMED uses software mixing to allow eight or more virtual channels, and it was possible for software to mix two hardware channels to achieve a single 14-bit resolution channel by playing with the volumes of the channels in such a way that one of the source channels contributes the most significant bits and the other the least.

The quality of the Amiga's sound output, and the fact that sound hardware is part of the standard chipset and easily addressed by software, were standout features of Amiga hardware unavailable on IBM PC compatibles for years. (Note: The Gravis UltraSound expansion card got released in 1992 and became the first on the PC platform to feature multiple sample sound channels (up to 32) mixed in hardware from its own RAM.) Third-party sound cards exist that provide DSP functions, multi-track direct-to-disk recording, multiple hardware sound channels and 16-bit and beyond resolutions. A retargetable sound API called AHI was developed allowing these cards to be used transparently by the OS and software.

=== Kickstart firmware ===
Kickstart is the firmware upon which AmigaOS is bootstrapped. Its purpose is to initialize the Amiga hardware and core components of AmigaOS and then attempt to boot from a bootable volume, such as a floppy disk or hard disk drive. Most models (excluding the Amiga 1000) come equipped with Kickstart on an embedded ROM-chip. There are various editions of Kickstart ROMs starting with Kickstart v1.1 for the Amiga 1000, v1.2 and v1.3 for the A500, Kickstart v2.1 on A500+, Kickstart v2.2 for A600 and dual ROMs for Kickstart v3.0 and 3.1 for A1200 and A4000. After Commodore's demise, there have been new Kickstart v3.1 ROMs made available for both the A500 and A600 Computers. Amiga Software is mostly backward compatible, but v2.1 ROMs and newer differ slightly, which can cause software glitches with earlier programs. To help address this and to get earlier programs to work with later Kickstart ROMs, some tools have been produced such as RELOKIK 1.4 and MAKE IT WORK! for the A600 and A1200. They revert the system to temporarily boot in Kickstart v1.3.

=== Keyboard and mouse ===
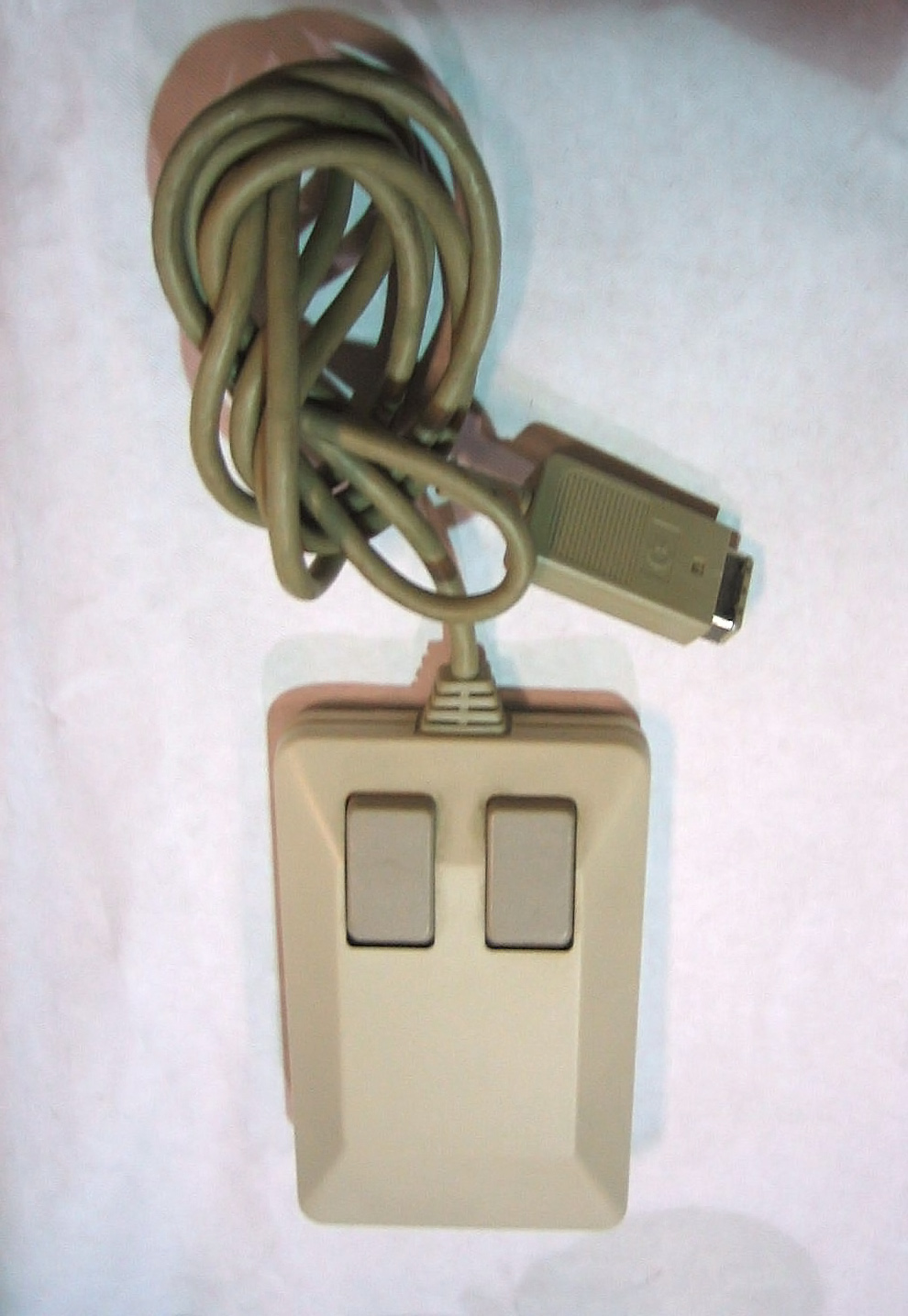
Amiga mouse

The keyboard on Amiga computers is similar to that found on a mid-80s IBM PC: Ten function keys, a numeric keypad, and four separate directional arrow keys. Caps Lock and Control share space to the left of A. Absent are Home, End, Page Up, and Page Down keys: These functions are accomplished on Amigas by pressing shift and the appropriate arrow key. The Amiga keyboard adds a Help key, which a function key usually acts as on PCs (usually F1). In addition to the Control and Alt modifier keys, the Amiga has 2 Amiga keys, rendered as Open Amiga and Closed Amiga similar to the Open and Closed Apple logo keys on Apple II keyboards. The left is used to manipulate the operating system (moving screens and the like) and the right delivers commands to the application. The absence of Num lock frees space for more mathematical symbols around the numeric pad.

Like IBM-compatible computers, the mouse has two buttons, but in AmigaOS, pressing and holding the right button replaces the system status line at the top of the screen with a Mac-like menu bar. As with Apple's Mac OS prior to Mac OS 8, menu options are selected by releasing the button over that option, not by left clicking. Menu items that have a Boolean toggle state can be left clicked whilst the menu is kept open with the right button, which allows the user, for example, to set some selected text to bold, underline and italics in one visit to the menus.

The mouse plugs into one of two Atari joystick ports used for joysticks, game paddles, and graphics tablets. Although compatible with analog joysticks, Atari-style digital joysticks became standard. Unusually, two independent mice can be connected to the joystick ports; some games, such as Lemmings, were designed to take advantage of this.

=== Other peripherals and expansions ===
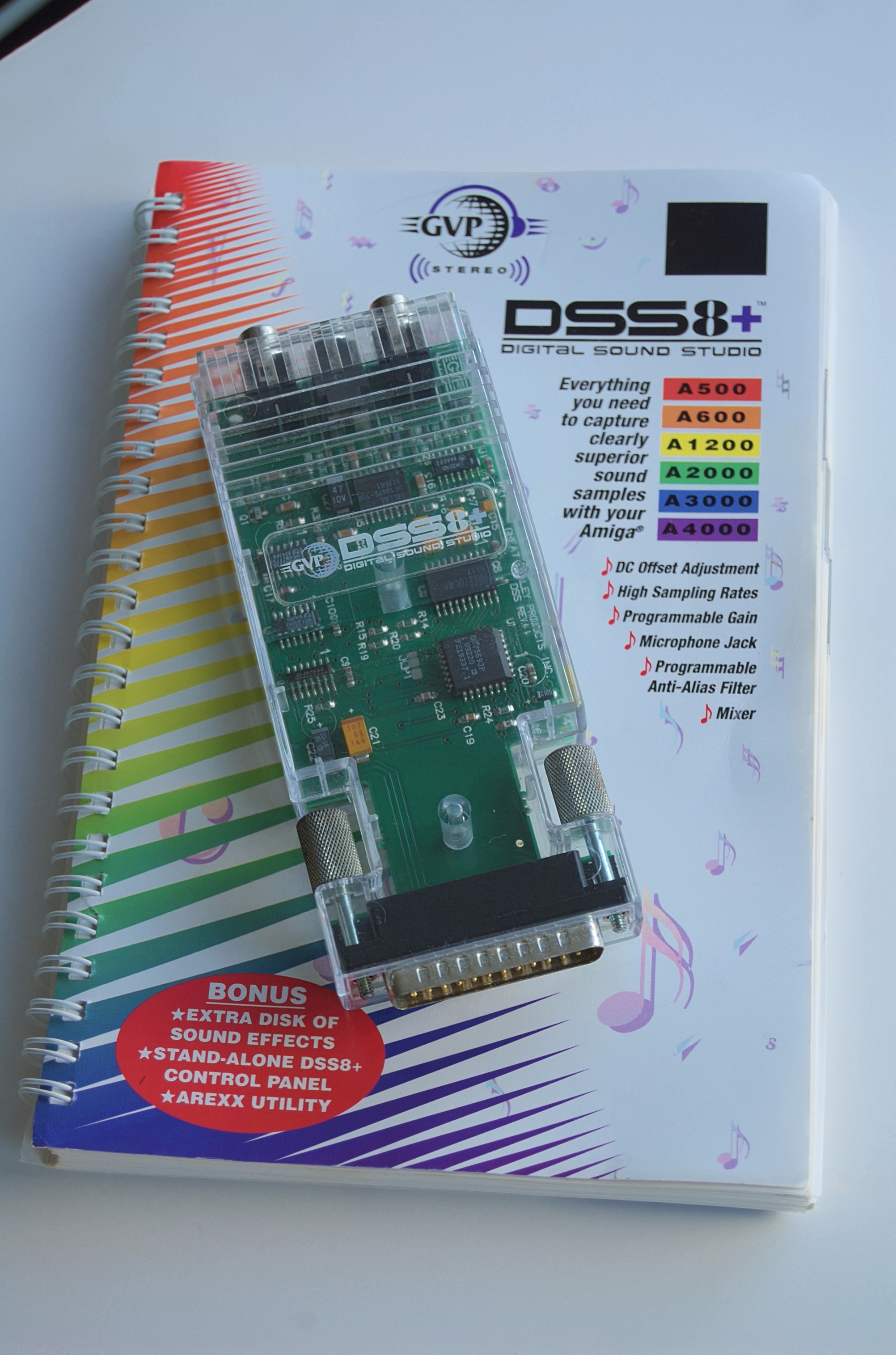
8-bit sound sampling hardware for the Amiga

The Amiga was one of the first computers for which inexpensive sound sampling and video digitization accessories were available. As a result of this and the Amiga's audio and video capabilities, the Amiga became a popular system for editing and producing both music and video.

Many expansion boards were produced for Amiga computers to improve the performance and capability of the hardware, such as memory expansions, SCSI controllers, CPU boards, and graphics boards. Other upgrades include genlocks, network cards for Ethernet, modems, sound cards and samplers, video digitizers, extra serial ports, and IDE controllers. Additions after the demise of Commodore include USB cards. The most popular upgrades were memory, SCSI controllers and CPU accelerator cards. These were sometimes combined into one device.

Early CPU accelerator cards used the full 32-bit CPUs of the 68000 family, such as the Motorola 68020 and Motorola 68030, almost always with 32-bit memory and usually with FPUs and MMUs or the facility to add them. Later designs feature the Motorola 68040 or Motorola 68060, both of which feature integrated FPUs and MMUs. Many CPU accelerator cards also had integrated SCSI controllers.

Phase5 designed the PowerUP boards (Blizzard PPC and CyberStorm PPC) featuring both a 68k (a 68040 or 68060) and a PowerPC (603 or 604) CPU, which are able to run the two CPUs at the same time and share the system memory. The PowerPC CPU on PowerUP boards is usually used as a coprocessor for heavy computations; a powerful CPU is needed to run MAME, for example, but even decoding JPEG pictures and MP3 audio was considered heavy computation at the time. It is also possible to ignore the 68k CPU and run Linux on the PPC via project Linux APUS, but a PowerPC-native AmigaOS promised by Amiga Technologies GmbH was not available when the PowerUP boards first appeared.

24-bit graphics cards and video cards were also available. Graphics cards were designed primarily for 2D artwork production, workstation use, and later, gaming. Video cards are designed for inputting and outputting video signals, and processing and manipulating video.

In the North American market, the NewTek Video Toaster was a video effects board that turned the Amiga into an affordable video processing computer that found its way into many professional video environments. One well-known use was to create the special effects in early series of Babylon 5. Due to its NTSC-only design, it did not find a market in countries that used the PAL standard, such as in Europe. In those countries, the OpalVision card was popular, although less featured and supported than the Video Toaster. Low-cost time base correctors (TBC) specifically designed to work with the Toaster quickly came to market, most of which were designed as standard Amiga bus cards.

Various manufacturers started producing PCI busboards for the A1200, A3000 and A4000, allowing standard Amiga computers to use PCI cards such as graphics cards, Sound Blaster sound cards, 10/100 Ethernet cards, USB cards, and television tuner cards. Other manufacturers produced hybrid boards that contained an Intel x86 series chip, allowing the Amiga to emulate a PC.

PowerPC upgrades with Wide SCSI controllers, PCI busboards with Ethernet, sound and 3D graphics cards, and tower cases allowed the A1200 and A4000 to survive well into the late nineties.

Expansion boards were made by Richmond Sound Design that allow their show control and sound design software to communicate with their custom hardware frames either by ribbon cable or fiber optic cable for long distances, allowing the Amiga to control up to eight million digitally controlled external audio, lighting, automation, relay and voltage control channels spread around a large theme park, for example. See Amiga software for more information on these applications.

Other devices included the following:

- Amiga 501 with 512 KB RAM and real-time clock
- Trumpcard 500 Zorro-II SCSI interface
- GVP A530 Turbo, accelerator, RAM expansion, PC emulator
- A2091 / A590 SCSI hard disk controller + 2 MB RAM expansion
- A3070 SCSI tape backup unit with a capacity of 250 MB, OEM Archive Viper 1/4-inch
- A2065 Ethernet Zorro-II interface – the first Ethernet interface for Amiga; uses the AMD Am7990 chip The same interface chip is used in DECstation as well.
- Ariadne Zorro-II Ethernet interface using the AMD Am7990
- A4066 Zorro II Ethernet interface using the SMC 91C90QF
- X-Surf from Individual Computers using the Realtek 8019AS
- A2060 Arcnet
- A1010 floppy disk drive consisting of a 3.5-inch double density (DD), 300 rpm, 250 kbit/s drive unit connected via DB-23 connector; track-to-track delay is on the order of ~94 ms. The default capacity is 880 KB. Many clone drives were available, and products such as the Catweasel and KryoFlux make it possible to read and write Amiga and other special disc formats on standard x86 PCs.
- NE2000-compatible PCMCIA Ethernet cards for Amiga 600 and Amiga 1200

==== Serial ports ====
The Commodore A2232 board provides seven RS-232C serial ports in addition to the Amiga's built-in serial port. Each port can be driven independently at speeds of 50 to 19,200 bits/s. There is, however, a driver available on Aminet that allows two of the serial ports to be driven at 115,200 bits/s. The serial card used the 65CE02 CPU clocked at 3.58 MHz. This CPU was also part of the CSG 4510 CPU core that was used in the Commodore 65 computer.

==== Networking ====
Amiga has three networking interface APIs:

- AS225: the official Commodore TCP/IP stack API with hard-coded drivers in revision 1 (AS225r1) for the A2065 Ethernet and the A2060 Arcnet interfaces. In revision 2, (AS225r2) the SANA-II interface was used.
- SANA-II: a standardized API for hardware of network interfaces. It uses an inefficient buffer handling scheme and lacks proper support for promiscuous and multicast modes.
- Miami Network Interface (MNI): an API that doesn't have the problems that SANA-II suffers from. It requires AmigaOS v2.04 or higher.

Different network media were used:

Type	Speed	Example
Ethernet	10,000 kbit/s	A2065
ARCNET	2,500 kbit/s	A560, A2060
Floppy disk controller	250 kbit/s	Amitrix: Amiga-Link
Serial port	≤115.2 kbit/s	RS-232
Parallel port	≈1,600 kbit/s	Village Tronic: Liana
Token Ring	1,500 kbit/s	Nine Tiles: AmigaLink (9 Tiles)
AppleTalk / LocalTalk	230.4 – 460 kbit/s	PPS-Doubletalk

== Models and variants ==
The original Amiga models were produced from 1985 to 1996. They are, in order of production: 1000, 2000, 500, 1500, 2500, 3000, 3000UX, 3000T, CDTV, 500+, 600, 4000, 1200, CD32, and 4000T. The PowerPC-based AmigaOne computers were later marketed beginning in 2002. Several companies and private persons have also released Amiga clones and still do so today.

=== Commodore Amiga ===
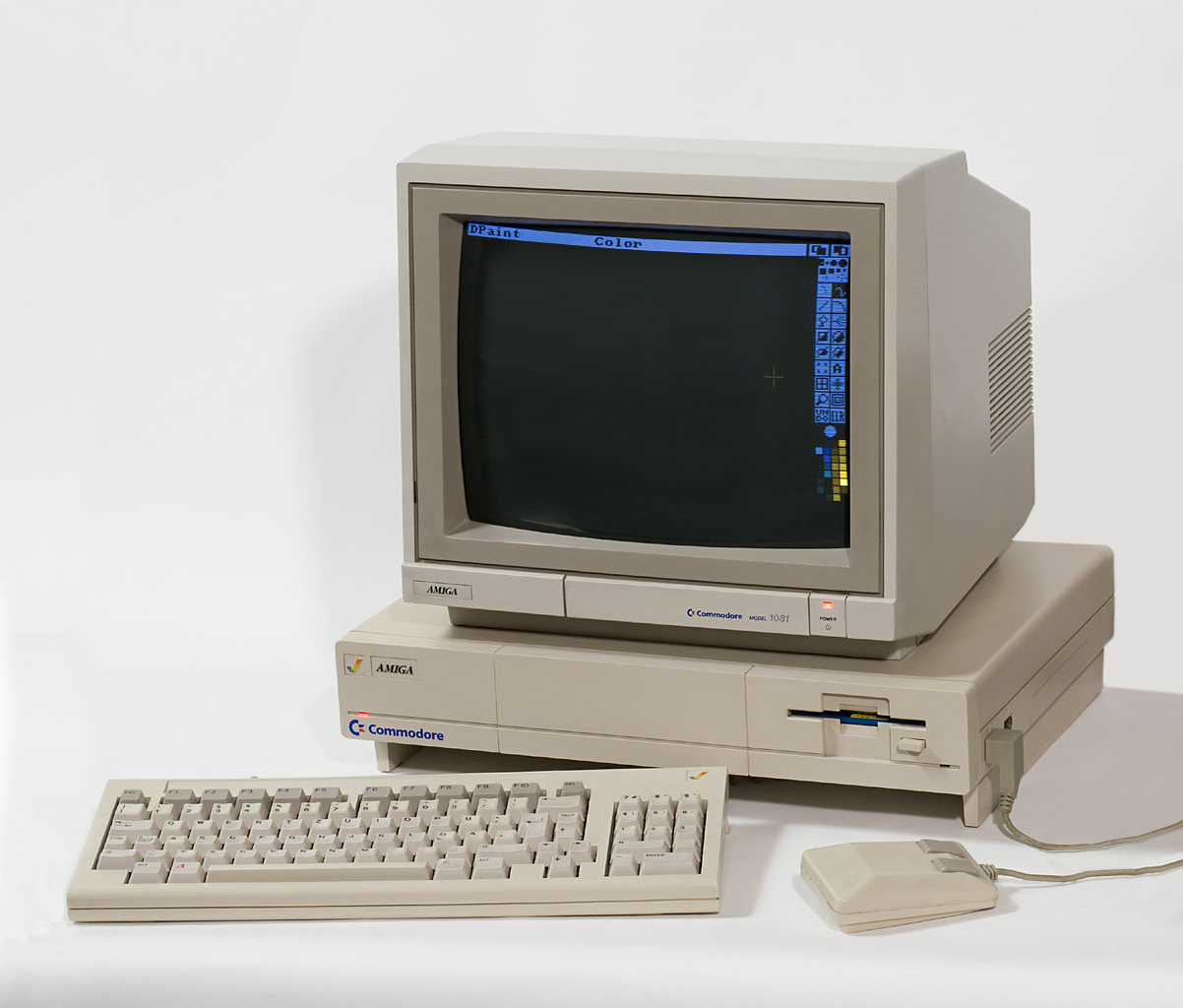
The Amiga 1000 (1985) was the first model released.

The first Amiga model, the Amiga 1000, was launched in 1985. In 2006, PC World rated the Amiga 1000 as the seventh greatest PC of all time, stating "Years ahead of its time, the Amiga was the world's first multimedia, multitasking personal computer".

Commodore updated the desktop line of Amiga computers with the Amiga 2000 in 1987, the Amiga 3000 in 1990, and the Amiga 4000 in 1992, each offering improved capabilities and expansion options. The best-selling models were the budget models, particularly the highly successful Amiga 500 (1987) and the Amiga 1200 (1992). The Amiga 500+ (1991) was the shortest-lived model, replacing the Amiga 500 and lasting only six months until it was phased out and replaced with the Amiga 600 (1992). The A600 was only intended as a temporary gap filler until the A1200 was available for sale. The A600 was actually designed as a portable system, hence the lack of numeric Keypad, and it was originally to be named Amiga 300. Some early A600 models have retained the original A300 logo printed on the mainboard. The Amiga 600 was quickly replaced by the Amiga 1200.

The CDTV, launched in 1991, was a CD-ROM-based game console, a computer and multimedia appliance based on the Amiga A500 with the same v1.3 Kickstart ROM, several years before CD-ROM drives were common. The cost of CDTV media production and the CD-ROM drives at the time discouraged potential buyers and the system never achieved any real success. The CDTV was however one of the first ever CD-ROM-based machines that were mass-produced. A CDTV legacy is the external A570 CD-ROM drive expansion for the A500 computer.

Commodore's last Amiga offering before filing for bankruptcy was the Amiga CD32 (1993), a 32-bit CD-ROM games console produced until mid 1994. Although discontinued after Commodore's demise, it met with moderate commercial success in Europe. The CD32 was a next-generation CDTV, and it was designed and released by Commodore before the PlayStation. It was Commodore's last attempt to enter the ever-growing video-game console market.

Following the purchase of Commodore's assets by Escom in 1995, the A1200 and A4000T continued to be sold in small quantities until 1996, though the ground lost since the initial launch and the prohibitive expense of these units meant that the Amiga line never regained any real popularity.

Several Amiga models contained references to songs by the rock band The B-52's. Early A500 units had the words "B52/ROCK LOBSTER" silk-screen printed onto their printed circuit board, a reference to the song "Rock Lobster" The Amiga 600 referenced "JUNE BUG" (after the song "Junebug") and the Amiga 1200 had "CHANNEL Z" (after "Channel Z"), and the CD-32 had "Spellbound."

=== AmigaOS 4 systems ===
AmigaOS 4 is designed for PowerPC Amiga systems. It is mainly based on AmigaOS 3.1 source code, with some parts of version 3.9. Currently runs on both Amigas equipped with CyberstormPPC or BlizzardPPC accelerator boards, on the Teron series based AmigaOne computers built by Eyetech under license by Amiga, Inc., on the Pegasos II from Genesi/bPlan GmbH, on the ACube Systems Srl Sam440ep / Sam460ex / AmigaOne 500 systems and on the A-EON AmigaOne X1000.

AmigaOS 4.0 had been available only in developer pre-releases for numerous years until it was officially released in December 2006. Due to the nature of some provisions of the contract between Amiga Inc. and Hyperion Entertainment (the Belgian company that is developing the OS), the commercial AmigaOS 4 had been available only to licensed buyers of AmigaOne motherboards.

AmigaOS 4.0 for Amigas equipped with PowerUP accelerator boards was released in November 2007. Version 4.1 was released in August 2008 for AmigaOne systems, and in May 2011 for Amigas equipped with PowerUP accelerator boards. The most recent release of AmigaOS for all supported platforms is 4.1 update 5. Starting with release 4.1 update 4 there is an Emulation drawer containing official AmigaOS 3.x ROMs (all classic Amiga models, including CD32) and related Workbench files.

Acube Systems entered an agreement with Hyperion under which it has ported AmigaOS 4 to its Sam440ep and Sam460ex line of PowerPC-based motherboards. In 2009 a version for Pegasos II was released in co-operation with Acube Systems. In 2012, A-EON Technology Ltd manufactured and released the AmigaOne X1000 to consumers through their partner, Amiga Kit who provided end-user support, assembly and worldwide distribution of the new system.

=== Amiga hardware clones ===
Long-time Amiga developer MacroSystem entered the Amiga-clone market with their DraCo non-linear video editing system. It appears in two versions, initially a tower model and later a cube. DraCo expanded upon and combined a number of earlier expansion cards developed for Amiga (VLabMotion, Toccata, WarpEngine, RetinaIII) into a true Amiga-clone powered by the Motorola 68060 processor. The DraCo can run AmigaOS 3.1 up through AmigaOS 3.9. It is the only Amiga-based system to support FireWire for video I/O. DraCo also offers an Amiga-compatible Zorro-II expansion bus and introduced a faster custom DraCoBus, capable of 30 MB/sec transfer rates (faster than Commodore's Zorro-III). The technology was later used in the Casablanca system, a set-top box also designed for non-linear video editing.

In 1998, Index Information released the Access, an Amiga-clone similar to the Amiga 1200, but on a motherboard that could fit into a standard 5 1/4-inch drive bay. It features either a 68020 or 68030 CPU, with a AGA chipset, and runs AmigaOS 3.1.

In 1998, former Amiga employees (John Smith, Peter Kittel, Dave Haynie and Andy Finkel, to mention few) formed a new company called PIOS. Their hardware platform, PIOS One, was aimed at Amiga, Atari and Macintosh users. The company was renamed to Met@box in 1999 until it folded.

The NatAmi (short for Native Amiga) hardware project began in 2005 with the aim of designing and building an Amiga clone motherboard that is enhanced with modern features. The NatAmi motherboard is a standard Mini-ITX-compatible form factor computer motherboard, powered by a Motorola/Freescale 68060 and its chipset. It is compatible with the original Amiga chipset, which has been inscribed on a programmable FPGA Altera chip on the board. The NatAmi is the second Amiga clone project after the Minimig motherboard, and its history is very similar to that of the C-One mainboard developed by Jeri Ellsworth and Jens Schönfeld. From a commercial point of view, Natami's circuitry and design are currently closed source. One goal of the NatAmi project is to design an Amiga-compatible motherboard that includes up-to-date features but that does not rely on emulation (as in WinUAE), modern PC Intel components, or a modern PowerPC mainboard. As such, NatAmi is not intended to become another evolutionary heir to classic Amigas, such as with AmigaOne or Pegasos computers. This "purist" philosophy essentially limits the resulting processor speed but puts the focus on bandwidth and low latencies. The developers also recreated the entire Amiga chipset, freeing it from legacy Amiga limitations such as two megabytes of audio and video graphics RAM as in the AGA chipset, and rebuilt this new chipset by programming a modern FPGA Altera Cyclone IV chip. Later, the developers decided to create from scratch a new software-form processor chip, codenamed "N68050" that resides in the physical Altera FPGA programmable chip.

In 2006, two new Amiga clones were announced, both using FPGA-based hardware synthesis to replace the Amiga OCS custom chipset. The first, the Minimig, is a personal project of Dutch engineer Dennis van Weeren. Referred to as "new Amiga hardware", the original model was built on a Xilinx Spartan-3 development board, but soon a dedicated board was developed. The minimig uses the FPGA to reproduce the custom Denise, Agnus, Paula and Gary chips as well as both 8520 CIAs and implements a simple version of Amber. The rest of the chips are an actual 68000 CPU, RAM chips, and a PIC microcontroller for BIOS control. The design for Minimig was released as open-source on July 25, 2007. In February 2008, an Italian company Acube Systems began selling Minimig boards. A third-party upgrade replaces the PIC microcontroller with a more powerful ARM processor, providing more functionality such as write access and support for hard disk images. The Minimig core has been ported to the FPGArcade "Replay" board. The Replay uses an FPGA with about three times more capacity and that does support the AGA chipset and a 68020 soft core with 68030 capabilities. The Replay board is designed to implement many older computers and classic arcade machines.

The second is the Clone-A system announced by Individual Computers. As of mid-2007, it had been shown in its development form, with FPGA-based boards replacing the Amiga chipset and mounted on an Amiga 500 motherboard.

== Operating systems ==
=== AmigaOS ===
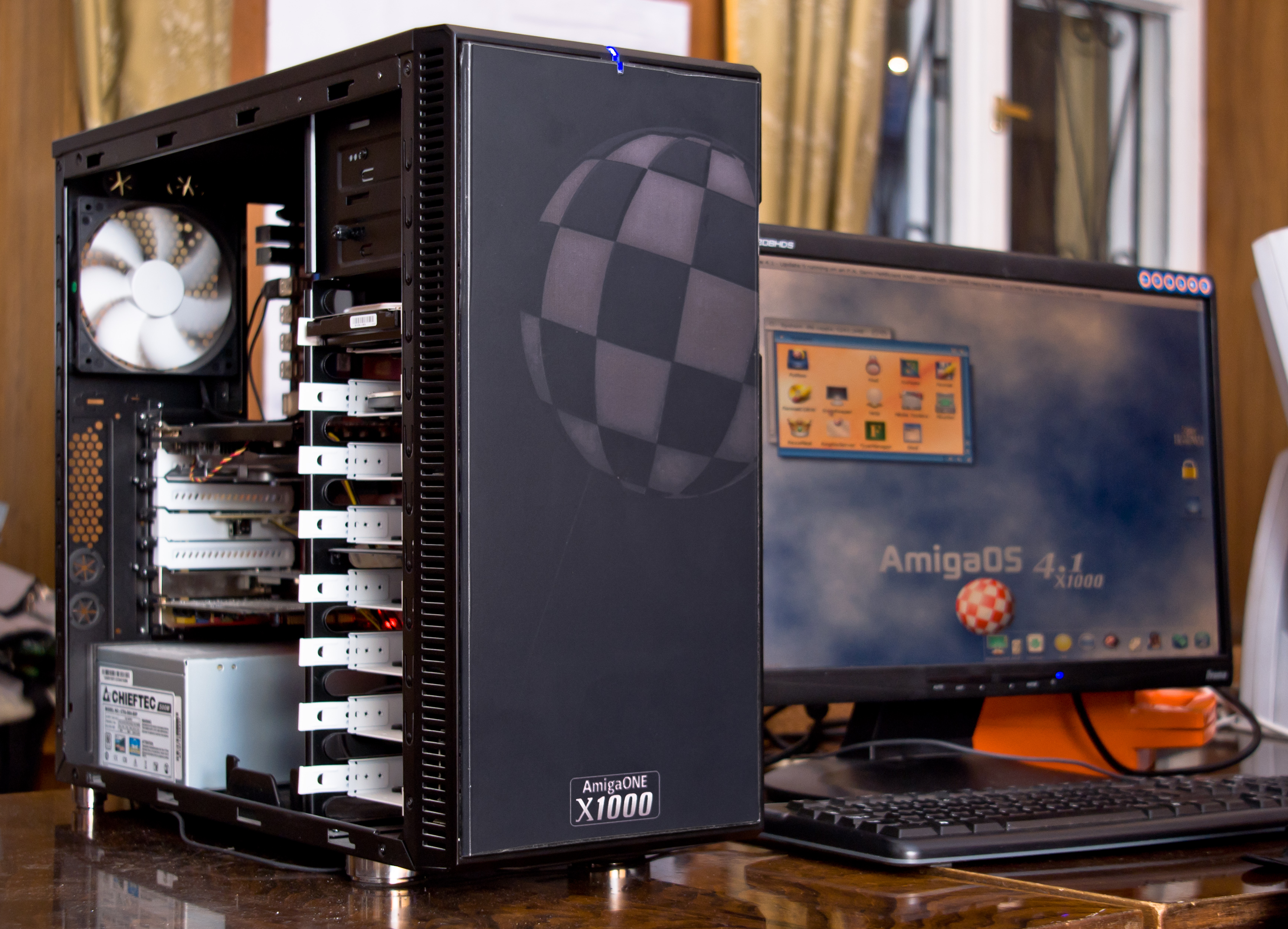
AmigaOne X1000 running AmigaOS 4.1

AmigaOS is a single-user multitasking operating system. It was one of the first commercially available consumer operating systems for personal computers to implement preemptive multitasking. It was developed first by Commodore International and initially introduced in 1985 with the Amiga 1000. John C. Dvorak wrote in PC Magazine in 1996:

[AmigaOS] remains one of the great operating systems of the past 20 years, incorporating a small kernel and tremendous multitasking capabilities the likes of which have only recently been developed in OS/2 and Windows NT. The biggest difference is that the AmigaOS could operate fully and multitask in as little as 250 K of address space.

AmigaOS combines a command-line interface and graphical user interface. AmigaDOS is the disk operating system and command line portion of the OS and Workbench the native graphical windowing, graphical environment for file management and launching applications. AmigaDOS allows long filenames (up to 107 characters) with whitespace and does not require filename extensions. The windowing system and user interface engine that handles all input events is called Intuition.

The multi-tasking kernel is called Exec. It acts as a scheduler for tasks running on the system, providing pre-emptive multitasking with prioritised round-robin scheduling. It enabled true pre-emptive multitasking in as little as 256 KB of free memory.

AmigaOS does not implement memory protection; the 68000 CPU does not include a memory management unit. Although this speeds and eases inter-process communication because programs can communicate by simply passing a pointer back and forth, the lack of memory protection made the AmigaOS more vulnerable to crashes from badly behaving programs than other multitasking systems that did implement memory protection, and Amiga OS is fundamentally incapable of enforcing any form of security model since any program had full access to the system. A co-operational memory protection feature was implemented in AmigaOS 4 and could be retrofitted to old AmigaOS systems using Enforcer or CyberGuard tools.

The problem was somewhat exacerbated by Commodore's initial decision to release documentation relating not only to the OS's underlying software routines, but also to the hardware itself, enabling intrepid programmers who had developed their skills on the Commodore 64 to POKE the hardware directly, as was done on the older platform. While the decision to release the documentation was a popular one and allowed the creation of fast, sophisticated sound and graphics routines in games and demos, it also contributed to system instabilityas some programmers lacked the expertise to program at this level. For this reason, when the new AGA chipset was released, Commodore declined to release low-level documentation in an attempt to force developers into using the approved software routines.

The latest version for the PPC Amigas is the AmigaOS 4.1 and for the 68k Amigas is the AmigaOS 3.2.2

==== Influence on other operating systems ====
AmigaOS directly or indirectly inspired the development of various operating systems. MorphOS and AROS clearly inherit heavily from the structure of AmigaOS as explained directly in articles regarding these two operating systems. AmigaOS also influenced BeOS, which featured a centralized system of Datatypes, similar to that present in AmigaOS. Likewise, DragonFly BSD was also inspired by AmigaOS as stated by Dragonfly developer Matthew Dillon who is a former Amiga developer. WindowLab and amiwm are among several window managers for the X Window System seek to mimic the Workbench interface. IBM licensed the Amiga GUI from Commodore in exchange for the REXX language license. This allowed OS/2 to have the WPS (Workplace Shell) GUI shell for OS/2 2.0, a 32-bit operating system.

=== Unix and Unix-like systems ===
Commodore-Amiga produced Amiga Unix, informally known as Amix, based on AT&T SVR4. It supports the Amiga 2500 and Amiga 3000 and is included with the Amiga 3000UX. Among other unusual features of Amix is a hardware-accelerated windowing system that can scroll windows without copying data. Amix is not supported on the later Amiga systems based on 68040 or 68060 processors.

Other, still maintained, operating systems are available for the classic Amiga platform, including Linux and NetBSD. Both require a CPU with MMU such as the 68020 with 68851 or full versions of the 68030, 68040 or 68060. There is also a version of Linux for Amigas with PowerPC accelerator cards. Debian and Yellow Dog Linux can run on the AmigaOne.

There is an official, older version of OpenBSD. The last Amiga release is 3.2. MINIX 1.5.10 also runs on Amiga.

=== Emulating other systems ===
The Amiga Sidecar is a complete IBM PC XT compatible computer contained in an expansion card. It was released by Commodore in 1986 and promoted as a way to run business software on the Amiga 1000.

== Amiga software ==
In the late 1980s and early 1990s the platform became particularly popular for gaming, demoscene activities and creative software uses. During this time commercial developers marketed a wide range of games and creative software, often developing titles simultaneously for the Atari ST due to the similar hardware architecture. Popular creative software included 3D rendering (ray-tracing) packages, bitmap graphics editors, desktop video software, software development packages and "tracker" music editors.

Until the late 1990s the Amiga remained a popular platform for non-commercial software, often developed by enthusiasts, and much of which was freely redistributable. An on-line archive, Aminet, was created in 1991 and until the late-1990s was the largest public archive of software, art and documents for any platform.

== Marketing ==
Logo used in the US on some product packaging for the Amiga 500

Amiga Technologies logo incorporating the "Boing Ball" (1996)

The name Amiga was chosen by the developers from the Spanish word for a female friend, because they knew Spanish, and because it occurred before Apple and Atari alphabetically. It also conveyed the message that the Amiga computer line was user friendly as a pun or play on words.

The first official Amiga logo was a rainbow-colored double check mark. In later marketing material, Commodore largely dropped the checkmark and used logos styled with various typefaces. Although it was never adopted as a trademark by Commodore, the "Boing Ball" has been synonymous with Amiga since its launch. It became an unofficial and enduring theme after a visually impressive animated demonstration at the 1984 Winter Consumer Electronics Show in January 1984, showing a checkered ball bouncing and rotating. Following Escom's purchase of Commodore in 1996, the Boing Ball theme was incorporated into a new logo.

Early Commodore advertisements attempted to cast the computer as an all-purpose business machine, though the Amiga was most commercially successful as a home computer. Throughout the 1980s and early 1990s Commodore primarily placed advertising in computer magazines and occasionally in national newspapers and on television.

== Legacy ==
Since the demise of Commodore, various groups have marketed successors to the original Amiga line:

- Genesi sold PowerPC based hardware under the Pegasos brand running AmigaOS and MorphOS;
- Eyetech sold PowerPC based hardware under the AmigaOne brand from 2002 to 2005 running AmigaOS 4;
- Amiga Kit distributes and sells PowerPC based hardware under the AmigaOne brand from 2010 to present day running AmigaOS 4;
- ACube Systems sells the AmigaOS 3 compatible Minimig system with a Freescale MC68SEC000 CPU (Motorola 68000 compatible) and AmigaOS 4 compatible Sam440 / Sam460 / AmigaOne 500 systems with PowerPC processors;
- A-EON Technology Ltd sells the AmigaOS 4 compatible AmigaOne X1000 system with P.A. Semi PWRficient PA6T-1682M processor, X5000 and A1222+ computers.
- AmigaKit Ltd produce the A600GS and A1200NG computers systems. They also manufacture and sell a wide range of aftermarket components to refurbished classic systems.
- ASB Computer Spain sell numerous items from aftermarket components to refurbished classic systems.

AmigaOS and MorphOS are commercial proprietary operating systems. AmigaOS 4, based on AmigaOS 3.1 source code with some parts of version 3.9, is developed by Hyperion Entertainment and runs on PowerPC-based hardware. MorphOS, based on some parts of AROS source code, is developed by the MorphOS Team and is continued on Apple and other PowerPC-based hardware.

There is also AROS, a free and open source operating system (re-implementation of the AmigaOS 3.1 APIs), for Amiga 68k, x86 and ARM hardware (one version runs Linux-hosted on the Raspberry Pi). In particular, AROS for Amiga 68k hardware aims to create an open source Kickstart ROM replacement for emulation purposes or for use on real classic hardware.

=== Magazines ===
Amiga Format continued publication until 2000. Amiga Active was launched in 1999 and was published until 2001.

Several magazines are in publication today: Print magazine Amiga Addict started publication in 2020.Amiga Future, which is available in both English and German; Bitplane.it, a bimonthly magazine in Italian; and AmigaPower, a long-running French magazine.

=== Trade shows ===
The Amiga continues to be popular enough that fans continue to support conferences such as Amiga37, which had over 50 vendors.

== Uses ==
The Amiga series of computers found a place in early computer-based graphic design and television presentation. Season 1 and part of season 2 of the television series Babylon 5 were rendered in LightWave 3D on Amigas. Other television series using Amigas for special effects included SeaQuest DSV and Max Headroom.

In addition, many celebrities and notable individuals have made use of the Amiga:

- Andy Warhol was an early user of the Amiga and appeared at the launch, where he made a computer artwork of Debbie Harry. Warhol used the Amiga to create a new style of art made with computers, and was the author of a multimedia opera called You Are the One, which consists of an animated sequence featuring images of actress Marilyn Monroe assembled in a short movie with a soundtrack. The video was discovered on two old Amiga floppies in a drawer in Warhol's studio and repaired in 2006 by the Detroit Museum of New Art. The pop artist has been quoted as saying: "The thing I like most about doing this kind of work on the Amiga is that it looks like my work in other media".
- Artist Jean "Moebius" Giraud credits the Amiga he bought for his son as a bridge to learning about "using paint box programs". He uploaded some of his early experiments to the file sharing forums on CompuServe.
- Futurist and science fiction author Arthur C. Clarke used an Amiga computer to calculate and explore Mandelbrot sets in the 1988 documentary film God, the Universe and Everything Else.
- The "Weird Al" Yankovic film UHF contains a computer-animated music video parody of the Dire Straits song "Money for Nothing", titled "Money for Nothing/Beverly Hillbillies*". According to the DVD commentary track, this spoof was created on an Amiga home computer.
- Rolf Harris used an Amiga to digitize his hand-drawn artwork for animation on his television series Rolf's Cartoon Club.
- Debbie Harry appeared together with Andy Warhol (see above) at launch.
- Todd Rundgren's video "Change Myself" was produced with Toaster and Lightwave.
- Scottish pop artist Calvin Harris composed his 2007 debut album I Created Disco with an Amiga 1200.
- Susumu Hirasawa, a Japanese progressive-electronic artist, is known for using Amigas to compose and perform music, aid his live shows and make his promotional videos. He has also been inspired by the Amiga and has referenced it in his lyrics. His December 13, 1994, "Adios Jay" Interactive Live Show was dedicated to (then recently deceased) Jay Miner. He also used the Amiga to create the virtual drummer TAINACO, who was a CG-rendered figure whose performance was made with Elan Performer and was projected with DCTV. He also composed and performed "Eastern-boot", the AmigaOS 4 boot jingle.
- Electronic musician Max Tundra created his three albums with an Amiga 500.
- Bob Casale, keyboardist and guitarist of the new wave band Devo, used Amiga computer graphics on the album cover to Devo's album Total Devo.
- Most of Pokémon Gold and Silver's music was created on an Amiga computer, converted to MIDI, and then reconverted to the game's music format.
- American professional skateboarder Tony Hawk used an Amiga 2000 during the late 1980s to early 1990s. NewTek sent him a Video Toaster for his Amiga in exchange for appearing in a promotional video alongside Wil Wheaton and Penn Jillette, which he later used for editing a promotional video for the TurboDuo game Lords of Thunder in 1993.
- Veteran actor Dick Van Dyke also owned an Amiga equipped with a Video Toaster, where he is credited with the creation of 3D-rendered effects used on Diagnosis: Murder and The Dick Van Dyke Show Revisited. Van Dyke has displayed his computer-generated imagery work at SIGGRAPH, and continues to work with LightWave 3D.
- A number of notable producers used OctaMED for composition and live performance of Drum and Bass, Jungle, and various other sub-genres of electronic dance music on Amiga systems, occasionally in conjunction with additional synthesizers. These include: Aphrodite, DJ Zinc, Omni Trio, and Paradox, among others.
- Electronic musician Deaton Chris Anthony uses an Amiga to produce music (in addition to a modern Mac-based setup). Anthony has referred to the computer as his "inspiration creator".

=== Special purpose applications ===
- Amigas were used in various NASA laboratories to keep track of low-orbiting satellites until 2004. Amigas were used at Kennedy Space Center to run strip-chart recorders, to format and display data, and control stations of platforms for Delta rocket launches.
- Palomar Observatory used Amigas to calibrate and control the charge-coupled devices in their telescopes, as well as to display and store the digitized images they collected.
- London Transport Museum developed their own interactive multi-media software for the CD32 including a virtual tour of the museum.
- Amiga 500 motherboards were used, in conjunction with a LaserDisc player and genlock device, in arcade games manufactured by American Laser Games.
- A custom Amiga 4000T motherboard was used in the HDI 1000 medical ultrasound system built by Advanced Technology Labs.
- As of 2015, the Grand Rapids Public School district uses a Commodore Amiga 2000 with 1200 baud modem to automate its air conditioning and heating systems for the 19 schools covered by the GRPS district. The system has been operating day and night for decades.
- The Weather Network used Amigas to display the weather on TV.
- The Amiga 3000 was the basis of the Virtuality virtual reality machines of the early 1990s.

== See also ==
- Amiga Forever
- List of Amiga games
- Amiga emulation
- SAGE Computer Technology
