= X1000 =

X1000 may refer to:

- Radeon R520, line of DirectX 9.0c and OpenGL 2.0 3D accelerator X1000 video cards from ATI
- AmigaOne X1000, PowerPC based computer intended as a high-end platform for AmigaOS 4
