= Hyperion Entertainment =

Belgian software development company

Hyperion Entertainment CVBA
- Formerly: Hyperion Entertainment VOF
- Type: Private
- Industry: Computer software
- Founded: April 1999; 27 years ago
- Headquarters: Brussels, Belgium
- Key people: Ben Yoris, Benjamin Hermans, Timothy de Groote, Evert Carton
- Products: AmigaOS 4
- Website: www.hyperion-entertainment.com

Hyperion Entertainment CVBA (formerly Hyperion Entertainment VOF) is a Belgian software company that, in its early years, focused in porting Windows games to Amiga OS, Linux, and Mac OS. In 2001, they accepted a contract by Amiga Incorporated to develop AmigaOS 4 and mainly discontinued their porting business to pursue this development. AmigaOS 4 runs on the AmigaOne systems, Commodore Amiga systems with a Phase5 PowerUP accelerator board, Pegasos II systems and Sam440/Sam460 systems.

== History ==
Hyperion Entertainment was founded in April 1999 by Ben Hermans and Evert Carton to port PC games to the Amiga. Hans-Joerg Frieden, who had previously worked on the Warp3D library and ports of the games Descent and Abuse, was contracted to be Hyperion's main developer. The company's first project was an Amiga port of Heretic II, released in 2000 to commercial failure. As a result, Hyperion expanded its scope to also include ports for Linux and Mac OS. Later that year, Hyperion ported SiN for Linux, postponing and ultimately cancelling a port of the game to the Amiga due to hardware requirements. An improved version of Heretic II was released for AmigaOS 4 in early 2024.

They also approached Monolith Productions to port their Lithtech engine, culminating in their port of Shogo: Mobile Armor Division for Amiga, Linux, and Mac OS in 2001. The game had not sold as well as had been hoped, most notably on Linux, despite becoming a best seller on Tux Games. Hyperion stated that Linux users were likely to dual boot with Windows to play easily available games rather than purchase more expensive specialised versions years after release. In early 2002, Hyperion introduced the Amiga port of Descent: FreeSpace – The Great War. An improved version for AmigaOS 4 followed in 2010. After id Software released its source code, Hyperion marketed later in 2002 a commercial Amiga port of Quake II. A Linux port of Gorky 17 was developed by Hyperion and published by Linux Game Publishing in 2006, while a version for AmigaOS 4 was released nearly a decade later in 2015.

During work on the Heretic II port, Hyperion Entertainment developers created an OpenGL subset called MiniGL, which sits on top of Warp3D to ease the porting of 3D games. The MiniGL library was released for free to other software developers.

=== AmigaOS 4 ===
In 2001, Hyperion announced that, after licensing the rights from Amiga, Inc., it would be working on the successor to AmigaOS 3.9 and concentrating its efforts on the development of AmigaOS 4. Hyperion still claimed that it is based upon AmigaOS 3.1 source code and, to a lesser extent certain, AmigaOS 3.9 sources. A quick port of 68k AmigaOS to PowerPC was originally planned, with new features added as development continued. Ben Hermans, writing on Amiga forum Ann.lu, claimed that these sources, along with the source of the PPC kernel WarpOS would be sufficient to provide a version to users within a year, making his now-infamous "change some flags and recompile" comment.

AmigaOS 4.0 was first released to end-users and second-level beta testers in April 2004, with AmigaOS 4.1 following in September 2008. It is currently still in development.

In 2004, Hyperion attempted to obtain a licence for an AmigaOS 4 native port of the file manager Directory Opus, which had originally and been developed on the Amiga but for which development had since moved to the Microsoft Windows platform. Talks between Hyperion and GP Software broke down.

The first managing partner of Hyperion, Benjamin Hermans, in the period between the announcement and release of AmigaOS 4, ignited a community controversy by repeatedly claiming that MorphOS, an AmigaOS-like competitor (which had been released in complete form in 2003), was illegal and had on several occasions threatened to take legal action against it either on the grounds that it was parasitic competition to AmigaOS 4, or even that it was actually based on stolen AmigaOS source code. No evidence to support either claim ever became public, nor did any legal action against MorphOS take place; neither prevented such views being repeated in public Amiga forums and mailing lists. This situation was inflamed by ex-Commodore engineer Dave Haynie, who backed up Herman's claims: "If you have seen the Amiga source code, you cannot produce a legally separate work-alike", though again without any direct evidence.

Hermans claimed that Bill Buck, who led the Genesi company funding MorphOS, was a "con-artist".

Evert Carton took over the managing partner position after Hermans stepped down in 2003, due to a lack of time for daily administrative work. Timothy de Groote became another partner in 2003.

=== Dispute and settlement with Amiga, Inc. ===
In 2007, Hyperion was sued by Amiga Incorporated for trademark infringement in the Washington Western District Court in Seattle, Washington. Amiga, Inc. sued Hyperion for breach of contract, trademark violation and copyright infringement concerning the development and marketing of AmigaOS 4, stating that Hyperion had continued to develop and market AmigaOS 4 without paying agreed royalties and had continued to do so even after being warned to cease and desist.

Hyperion launched a counteraction, claiming fraud in Amiga, Inc. handling of Amiga intellectual properties and debts, including the use of debt-holding shell companies, by shifting responsibility between these shell companies. They also claimed that Amiga, Inc. had failed to uphold their part of the contract and had been untruthful in correspondence and that they had failed to deliver the AmigaOS 3.1 source that AmigaOS 4 was developed from, forcing Hyperion to find it elsewhere. In autumn 2007, Hyperion released a standalone version of AmigaOS 4 for classic Amiga, an action Amiga, Inc. claimed was illegal.

On 29 May 2007, the new managing partner stated under oath – without further evidence – that the open-source AmigaOS reimplementation of AROS was "probably illegal", as documented on page 27 of court documents related to the Amiga-Hyperion court case.

Hyperion and Amiga, Inc. reached a settlement on 30 September 2009. Hyperion was granted an exclusive license to develop and market AmigaOS 4 and subsequent versions under the name AmigaOS. However, the "Amiga" trademark remained with Amiga, Inc. and was then also licensed to other parties, including Commodore USA and iContain. This meant that "Amiga"-branded hardware could and would be sold without AmigaOS 4.

In 2009, Hyperion changed its legal status from a business partnership (VOF) to a company with limited liability (CVBA).

On 24 April 2011, Evert Carton announced he was stepping down as the managing partner of Hyperion. In charge of the company were then Ben Hermans and Timothy de Groote.

=== Declared insolvency and leadership changes ===
On 27 January 2015, Hyperion Entertainment was declared insolvent. Ben Hermans has claimed that this was an administrative mistake by a third party and that the company would appeal the insolvency decision. The declaration was overturned on 2 April 2015 and the company posted a clarification on its website.

AmigaOS 4 developer and Aminet administrator Costel Mincea joined Hyperion in mid-2015 as a third director. Hyperion reported in January 2017 that Hermans has resigned as a director, in charge of the company remained Timothy De Groote and Costel Mincea. In October 2017, Hyperion was removed from Belgium's official company register due to not filling out annual reports for the last three years. Hyperion supplied the reports to the National Bank of Belgium. In July 2020, amiga-news.de reported that Costel Mincea resigned from his post at Hyperion and that remaining director Timothy de Groote was in a legal dispute with former Hyperion's managing partner Ben Hermans. In February 2021, Timothy de Groote was no longer director of Hyperion and Ben Hermans assumed full control of the company. After bankruptcy of Ben Hermans BV, which was the largest shareholder of Hyperion Entertainment, Timothy De Groote returned as a director in December 2024.

=== Dispute and settlement with Cloanto (Amiga) ===
By 2012, Cloanto, the company behind the Amiga Forever emulation package gained Amiga copyrights up to 1993 and in 2019 Amiga Inc. transferred all its IP (including Amiga trademarks and remaining copyrights) to C-A Acquisition Corp., owned by Mike Battilana (director of Cloanto). C-A Acquisition Corp. was later renamed to Amiga Corporation. Since 2017, Cloanto and Hyperion were in dispute over use and registration of AmigaOS and AmigaOne trademarks. In August 2026 Amiga Corporation and Hyperion announced that both companies reached a new settlement agreement ending their ongoing legal disputes.

== Game ports ==
Hyperion's game ports include Heretic II, Shogo: Mobile Armor Division, Gorky 17, Quake II, SiN and Descent: FreeSpace – The Great War. Hyperion also announced that it acquired the license to port Worms Armageddon and Soldier of Fortune, but these were not released.
