= Eyetech =

UK company

Eyetech Group Ltd is a company founded in 1983, in order to provide commercial companies with automatical data collection systems. They had already been involved in the provision of the automatic toll collection systems used at the Dartford River Crossing, as well as many of the bar code based tracking systems used by UK national parcel service.

== History ==
Eyetech Group Ltd was founded as a subsidiary of an international UK plc, before trading as its own, standalone plc following a management buyout in 1985. The company has mostly been involved in producing bespoke software systems for commercial use in the transport and distribution sector under Unix/AIX, track and trace systems involving the use of barcodes, which have been used by the majority of UK parcel carriers and bar code decoders and industrial (networked) shop floor data capture and access control systems.

== Interest in Amiga ==
Eyetech took an interest in Amiga, as well as being a registered Amiga developer, in 1993 and developed their Amiga related commercial systems to cover three main areas: as an integrated multimedia development/mass delivery platform for its existing customer base with custom systems built around Amiga architecture, using rehoused Amiga hardware as a low cost multitasking platform for shop floor data collection/control applications in smaller industrial companies and as a karaoke platform harnessing cdrom technology.

During years on the Amiga market, Eyetech manufactured several accessories for Amiga computers including CD-ROM/IDE solution for A1200, custom tower cases based on off the shelf pc towers with replacement backplane metal work to match A1200 ports riveted on. scan doubler/flicker fixer and even attempted to introduce extension to Zorro bus standard.

In 2000 Eyetech and Amiga, Inc. formed partnership to produce hardware for new AmigaOne platform. AmigaOne computers were introduced in 2002, first AmigaOne SE followed by AmigaOne XE and Micro-A1 models. Eyetech retired from the Amiga market in 2005 and subsequently sold their remaining Amiga business to Amiga Kit who claims to have continued manufacturing and distributing Eyetech products to the Amiga market to present day.
