= AmigaOne =

Series of computers intended to run AmigaOS 4

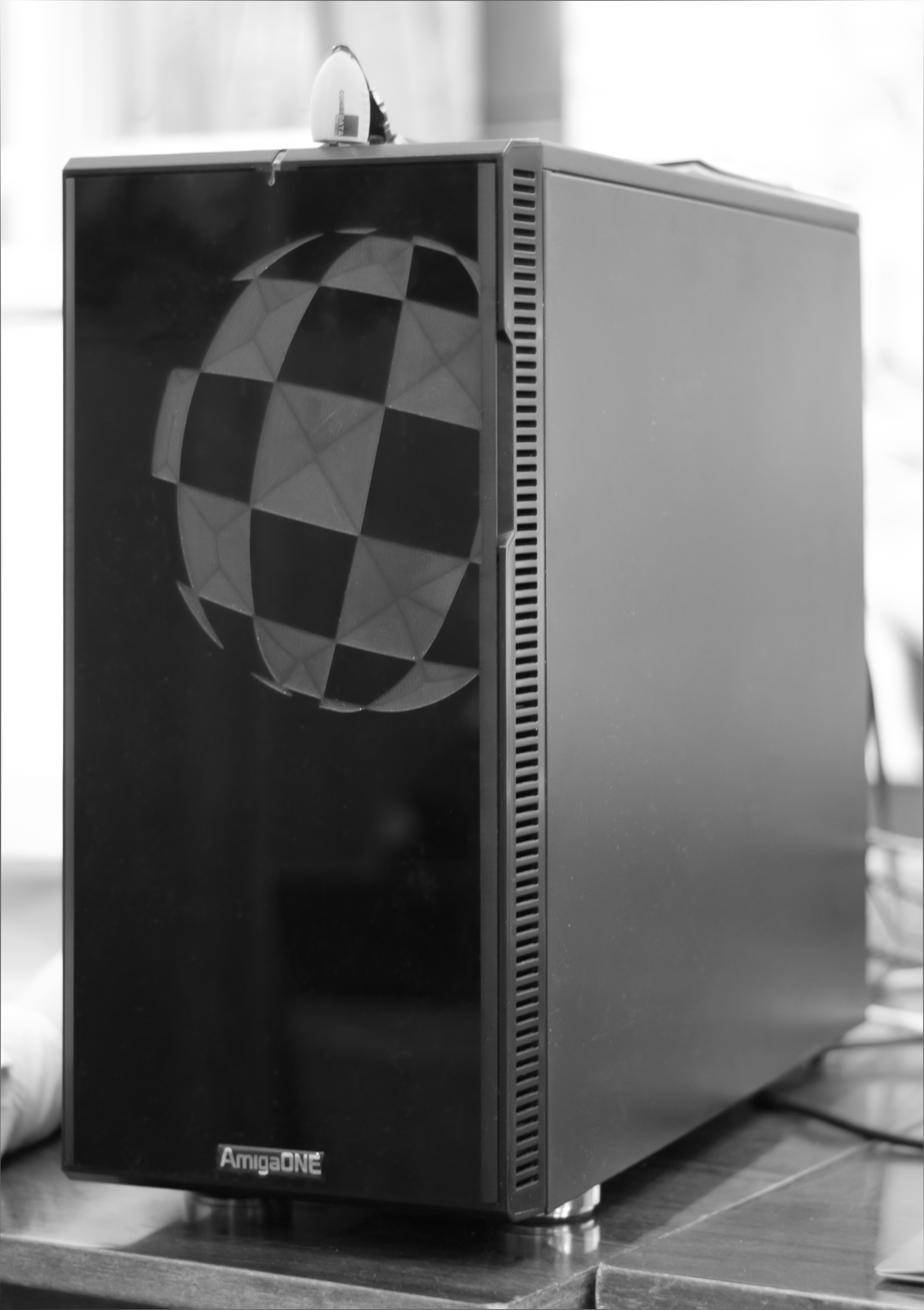
AmigaOne X1000

AmigaOne is a series of computers intended to run AmigaOS 4 developed by Hyperion Entertainment, as a successor to the Amiga series by Commodore International. Unlike the original Amiga computers, which used Motorola 68k processors, the AmigaOne line uses PowerPC processors. Earlier models were produced by Eyetech; in September 2009, Hyperion secured an exclusive licence for the AmigaOne name and subsequently new AmigaOne computers were released by A-Eon Technology and Acube Systems.

== History ==
=== AmigaOne by Eyetech (2000–05) ===
A week ago we shared with you our joy as we move towards the rebirth of the Amiga desktop platform. The AmigaOne and AmigaOS4 are projects that have occupied almost every day of our lives for the last two years. For the community, the wait and the false dawns have been unbearable.

— Bill McEwen CEO Amiga Inc, Executive Update, April 12, 2002

Originally in 2000, AmigaOne was the name of a project for new computer hardware to run the Amiga Digital Environment (DE), later plans replaced by AmigaOS 4. Initially it was managed by Eyetech and designed by the German company Escena GmbH. The AmigaOne motherboard was to be available in two models, the AmigaOne-1200 and the AmigaOne-4000 as expansions for the Amiga 1200 and Amiga 4000 computers. This would probably not have been actually possible. This AmigaOne project was cancelled in the design stage in 2001, mostly due to the inability to find or design a suitable northbridge chip. Eyetech, who at this point had invested funds into the project, was forced instead to license the Teron CX board from Mai to form the basis of the new AmigaONE computer range. The first fruit of this partnership with Mai, AmigaOne SE, was announced with a connector for an optionally attached Amiga 1200, in order to use the old custom chips of an Amiga for backwards compatibility. Nonetheless, no such solution was ever introduced.

The main difference between the ATX-format AmigaOne SE and AmigaOne XE was that the SE had a soldered-on 600 MHz PowerPC 750CXe processor, whereas the XE used a CPU board attached to a MegArray connector on the motherboard. While the MegArray connector is physically similar to the Apple Power Mac G4 CPU daughtercard connector, it is not electrically compatible. There were G3 and G4 options with a maximum clock frequency of 800 MHz and 933 MHz. The G4 module originally used a Freescale 7451 processor, which was later changed to a Freescale 7455, both without level 3 cache. The G4 CPU runs hotter and requires a better heatsink than that supplied on some machines. Consequently, the G4 was often supplied underclocked to run at 800 MHz. In 2007 Acube offered 1.267 GHz 7457. The Micro-A1 was announced in two configurations, under the Micro-A1 I (Industrial) and Micro-A1 C (Consumer) labels. Only the C configuration was produced.

Both AmigaOneG3-XE and AmigaOneG4-XE has four 32-bit PCI-slots (3× 33 MHz, 1× 66 MHz) and one AGP-2x slot. The Micro-A1 has only one 32-bit PCI-slot and an integrated Radeon 7000 via AGP with dedicated 32 MB VRAM.

AmigaOne (SE and XE) motherboards had several hardware issues including conflicts between the onboard IDE and Ethernet controllers, problems with USB device detection and initially no support for the on-board AC97 audio. Due to the mistaken belief that the on-board AC97 audio could not be supported, the AC97 codec was removed from later builds of the motherboard. The technical issues preventing AC97 audio support were later resolved.

When the AmigaOne boards first became available, AmigaOS 4 was not ready: they were supplied with various Linux distributions. From April 2004 onwards, boards were shipped for developers with a pre-release version of OS4. The Final Update of OS4.0 was released in December 2006, for AmigaOne computers only, with the PowerUP version being released in December 2007. AmigaOS 4.1 for AmigaOne was released in September 2008.

MAI Logic Inc. went bankrupt, and consequently the supply of Eyetech AmigaOnes dried up. Eyetech Group Ltd retired from the market in 2005, selling their remaining Amiga business to Amiga Kit.

=== AmigaOne by Hyperion Entertainment (2009–present) ===
In September 2009, as part of the resolution of a dispute over ownership of AmigaOS Hyperion was granted (among other provisions of the Settlement Agreement with Amiga, Inc.) an exclusive licence for the AmigaOne (or Amiga One) name. This Settlement Agreement thus created a legal basis for a new generation of AmigaOne computers.

In February 2010, a new Belgian company A-Eon Technology CVBA, in co-operation with Hyperion Entertainment, officially announced a new AmigaOne model, the AmigaOne X1000, first presented at the Vintage Computer Fair at Bletchley Park in June 2010. The project was delayed but the new platform was launched in 2012 with AmigaOS 4.1.5.

In September 2011, Acube Systems introduced the AmigaOne 500 based on a Sam460ex mainboard.

In October 2011, Hyperion Entertainment announced that it was launching an AmigaOne netbook in mid-2012, but it was announced at Amiwest 2013 that the netbook project had been cancelled.

Also at Amiwest 2013, A-Eon Technology Ltd, a British computer company, announced three new AmigaOne motherboards, with the project named Cyrus. A-Eon had a list of proposed names that could be voted for and in January 2014 A-Eon Technology announced names for new models as AmigaOne X5000/20, AmigaOne X5000/40 and AmigaOne X3500. The new motherboards were aimed as replacements for the AmigaOne X1000. The AmigaOne X5000/20 was released in October 2016 and - unlike the X1000 - sold via various distributors. ArsTechnica review of the AmigaOne X5000 commended its compatibility with old Amiga applications and games, but criticised the very high price and lack of new software.

Lastly, A-Eon Technology Ltd announced at Amiwest 2013 that A-Eon had signed a 1.2 million-dollar investment contract with Ultra Varisys for the ongoing design, development and manufacture of PowerPC hardware for its AmigaOne line of desktop computers.

In January 2015, Acube Systems started selling AmigaOne 500 computers based on the Sam460cr motherboard, a cost reduced version of original Sam460ex. Features that were removed included the Silicon Motion SM502 embedded MoC and 1× SATA2 port.

In autumn 2015, A-Eon Technology Ltd announced a new motherboard with the project development name Tabor based on a P1022 1.2 GHz SoC. The motherboard design is a microATX form factor with single PCIe slot and SODIMM memory slots. The full system is to be designated as the AmigaOne A1222. The A1222 was released in early 2024.

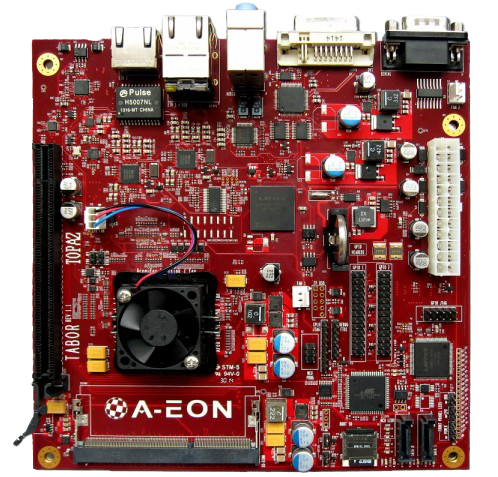
A1222 motherboard

== Models and variants ==
Computer	Vendor	Timescale	Memory	CPU	Expansion slots	Hard drive	Connectivity	Peripherals	OS Version	Additional Information
AmigaOne SE	Eyetech	2002–04	Varies PC133 SDRAM	750CXe 600 MHz	1× AGP 2× 1× 66 MHz PCI; 3× 33 MHz PCI	Ultra ATA/100	10BASE-T/100BASE-TX Ethernet	4× USB 1.1	4.0 or 4.1	This ATX format motherboard was sold only to developers and beta testers.
AmigaOne XE	Eyetech	2003–04	Varies PC133 SDRAM	750FX 800 MHz; 7451 800 MHz; 7455 933 MHz	1× AGP 2× 1× 66 MHz PCI; 3× 33 MHz PCI	Ultra ATA/100	10BASE-T/100BASE-TX Ethernet	4× USB 1.1	4.0 or 4.1	ATX format motherboard
Micro-A1 - C	Eyetech	2004–05	256 MB PC133 SDRAM	750FX 800 MHz; 750GX 800 MHz	1× 33 MHz PCI	Ultra ATA/100	10BASE-T/100BASE-TX Ethernet	4× USB 1.1	4.0 or 4.1	Mini-ITX format motherboard Integrated Radeon 7000 32 MB (AGP 2×)
Micro-A1 - I	Eyetech	never produced	256 MB PC133 SDRAM	750GX 800 MHz	1× 33 MHz PCI	Ultra ATA/133	Gigabit Ethernet	4× USB 1.1	-	Mini-ITX format motherboard Integrated Radeon 7000 32 MB (AGP 2×)
AmigaOne 500	Acube Systems	2011-14	2 GB DDR2 SDRAM	460EX 1.15 GHz	1× PCIe x16/x4 1× PCIe x1 1× 33 MHz PCI	SATA2	Gigabit Ethernet	6× USB 2.0; 1× USB 1.1	4.1	Complete system (or motherboard as Sam460ex); Integrated Silicon Motion SM502; SATA 3512 Controller in PCI slot
AmigaOne 500	Acube Systems	January 8, 2015	2 GB DDR2 SDRAM	460EX 1.10 GHz	1× PCIe x16/x4 1× PCIe x1 1× 33 MHz PCI	Provided via a PCI interface card	Gigabit Ethernet	6× USB 2.0; 1× USB 1.1	4.1 Final Edition	Complete system (or motherboard as Sam460cr); SATA SiI3114 Controller in PCI slot Envy24HT audio card in PCIe x1 slot
AmigaOne X1000	A-EON Technology	2012–15	2 or 4+ GB DDR2 SDRAM	PA6T 1.8 GHz	2× PCIe x16 (1×16 or 2×8); 2× PCIe x1 2× 33 MHz PCI; 1× Xorro	SATA2; Ultra ATA/133	Gigabit Ethernet	10× USB 2.0	4.1 Update 5	Complete system and later also only the motherboard Integrated "Xena" 500 MHz XCore XS1-L2 124 coprocessor
AmigaOne X5000/20	A-EON Technology	2016-	DDR3 SDRAM	P5020 2.0 GHz	1× PCIe 2.0 x16/x4 1× PCIe 2.0 x4 2× PCIe 2.0 x1 2× 33 MHz PCI; 1× Xorro	SATA2	Gigabit Ethernet	8× USB 2.0	4.1 Final Edition	Integrated "Xena" 500 MHz XCore XS1-L2 124 coprocessor
AmigaOne A1222	A-EON Technology	2024	DDR3 SDRAM	P1022 1.2 GHz	1× PCIe 2.0 x16/x4	SATA2	Gigabit Ethernet	4× USB 2.0	4.1 Final Edition Update 2	

== Operating systems ==
- Linux for PowerPC.
- AmigaOS versions 4.0, 4.1.
- MorphOS support for AmigaOne 500 / SAM460 was announced in 2012 and introduced with MorphOS 3.8. Support for X5000 was introduced with MorphOS 3.10.
- FreeBSD.

== Other AmigaOS4 compatible models ==
The Sam440 mainboard (complete with AMCC PowerPC 440EP SoC) is an embedded motherboard launched by Acube Systems in September 2007. AmigaOS 4 was released for the Sam440 in October 2008.

The Sam460ex mainboard (complete with AMCC 460ex SoC, PowerPC 440 core) is an embedded motherboard launched by Acube Systems in April 2010. AmigaOS 4 was released for the Sam460ex in January 2011. A cost reduced version, the Sam460cr, was released with AmigaOS 4.1 Final Edition on January 8, 2015.

The Pegasos II mainboard (complete with PPC G3 and G4 CPU) is a MicroATX motherboard launched by Genesi and discontinued in 2006. AmigaOS 4 was released for the Pegasos II in January 2009.

== See also ==
- Amiga models and variants
- Sam440
- Sam460ex
- Genesi Pegasos
- AmigaOS
- MorphOS
- AROS
- Commodore International
- Commodore USA
