= Soft core (synthesis) =

Type of digital circuit

A soft core (also called softcore) is a digital circuit that can be wholly implemented using logic synthesis. It can be implemented via different semiconductor devices containing programmable logic (e.g., ASIC, FPGA, CPLD), including both high-end and commodity variations. Many soft cores may be implemented in one FPGA. In those multi-core systems, rarely used resources can be shared between all the cores.

Examples of soft-core implementations are soft microprocessors, graphics chips like AGA or Open Graphics Project, hard disc controllers etc.

== See also ==
- SoC (System-on-a-chip)
- PSoC (Programmable System on a Chip)
- FPGA (Field-programmable gate array)
- Reconfigurable computing
- Minimig - Example implementation of custom chips replications
- Open-source hardware
- List of open source hardware projects
