= Sam460ex =

Modular motherboards

Sam460ex running AmigaOS 4.1

Sam460ex is a line of modular motherboards produced by the Italian company ACube Systems Srl. The machine was released in October 2010 and can run AmigaOS 4, MorphOS, AROS or Debian Linux (CruxPPC at first, and then Debian Squeeze or Ubuntu).

The Sam460ex made its debut at the Vintage Computer Festival at Bletchley Park in the UK on 19 June 2010, where it was demonstrated to the public running AmigaOS 4.1 along with the Timberwolf web browser, a port of the Mozilla Firefox for the AmigaOS 4. Its hardware features were also showcased, with its SIM card slot and aerial, its ability to boot AmigaOS from SD card. In September 2011, Acube Systems introduced AmigaOne 500 based on Sam460ex mainboard.

== Versions ==
=== Sam460ex ===
- FlexATX form factor (21.6 × 17 cm)
- AMCC 460ex SoC – passively cooled PowerPC 440 core up to 1.15 GHz and including a double precision floating point unit (FPU)
- Cache L1/L2: 32KB/256KB
- max 2 GB DDR2 SDRAM – 200-pin SODIMM up to 533 MHz
- Silicon Motion SM502 embedded MoC (audio/video) max 64MB video memory
- Audio 5.1 Realtek ALC655 codec
- PCI-express 4× lanes slot (v1.1, 16× mechanical connector)
- PCI-express 1× lane slot (mutually exclusive with the SATA2 port)
- PCI slot, 32 bit, 66/33 MHz, 3.3V
- 1× SATA2 port (mutually exclusive with the PCI-e 1× slot)
- 6× USB2 EHCI/OHCI ports
- 2× 10/100/1000 Ethernet ports
- SD card reader
- Serial port

The SATA2 port and the PCI-e 1× slot are mutually exclusive, only one of them can be used at a time.

=== Sam460ex Lite ===
The specifications are the same as for the Sam460ex, except for:

- AMCC 460ex SoC clocked at 1 GHz
- Cache L1/L2: 32KB/256KB
- 512 MB DDR2 RAM

=== Sam460cr ===
The specifications are the same as for the Sam460ex, except for:
Absence of

- Silicon Motion SM502 embedded MoC
- Audio 5.1 Realtek ALC655 codec
- Mutually exclusive 1× SATA2 port

Users are expected to use graphics, sound and Sata interface cards with this model.

== Reception ==
Amiga Power magazine saw PCIe expansion for modern graphics cards, silent fan-less CPU operation, plenty of RAM and USB 2.0 as main advantages of the new Sam460ex board. However, the same review mentioned among weak points CPU speed, problems with audio on some motherboards and lack of 3D drivers for Radeon HD cards under AmigaOS. Reviewing AmigaOne 500, Amiga Future magazine highlighted supplied 2 GB RAM and overall system performance comparable to older Pegasos II computer, but criticized weak built in graphics chip recommending customers to buy dedicated graphics card.

== See also ==
- Sam440ep
- AmigaOne
- AmigaOne X1000
- Pegasos
