= Sam440ep =

Type of motherboard

Sam440, also known by Sam or its codename Samantha, is a line of modular motherboards produced by the Italian company ACube Systems Srl. The Sam440ep version is a motherboard based on the PowerPC 440EP system-on-a-chip processor which includes a double-precision FPU. It is made by AMCC. Their primary targets are the industrial and embedded markets, running operating systems such as Linux and AmigaOS 4.

At the time of AmigaOS 4.1 release in 2008, it was the only AmigaOS 4 compatible hardware available since the manufacturing of AmigaOne machines ceased in 2005; Sam440 was later succeeded by the Sam460ex (AmigaOne 500) and AmigaOne X1000.

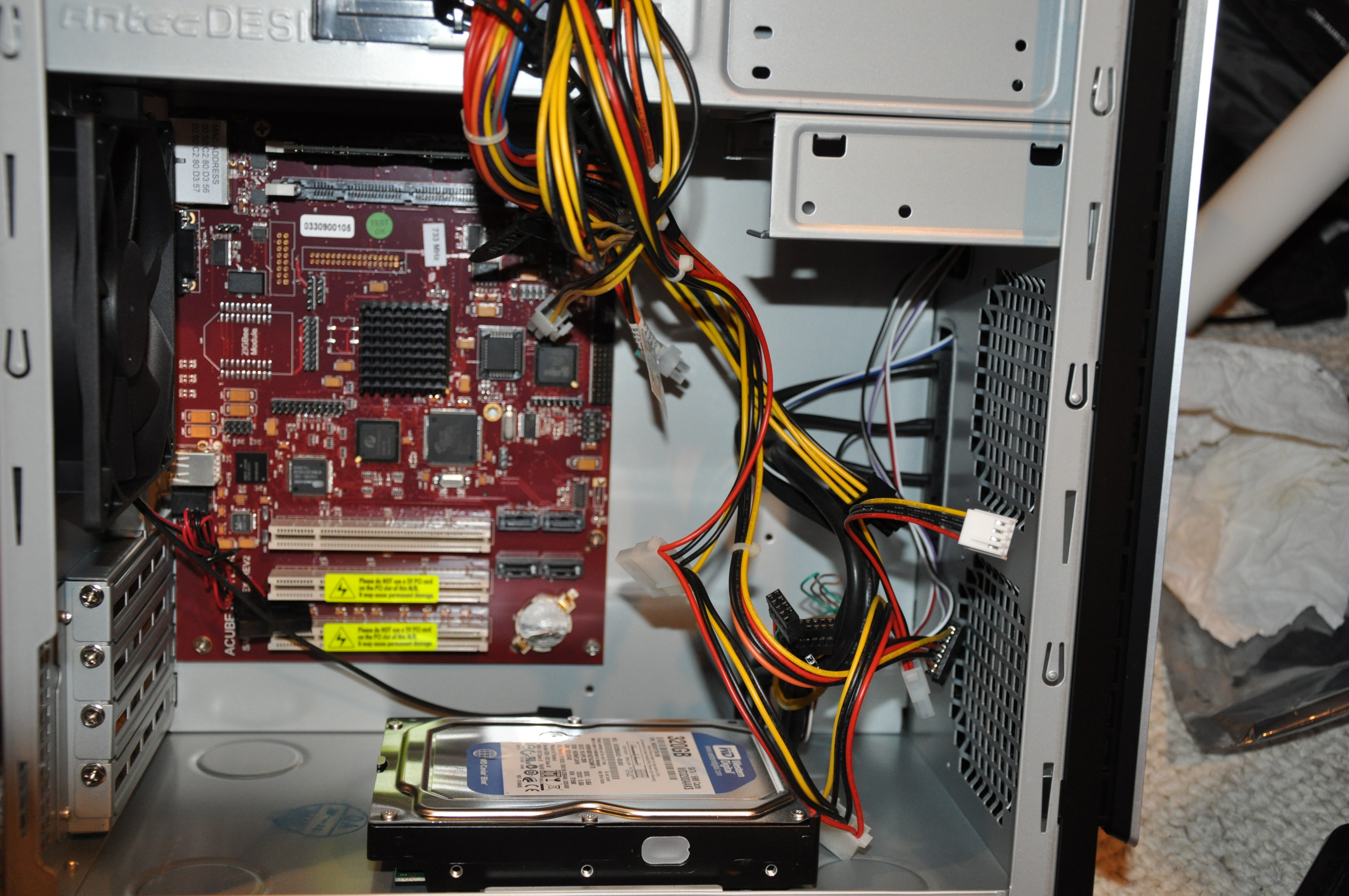
Sam440ep Flex motherboard

== Main features ==
Notable features of the Sam boards (including all versions):

- Low power consumption
- Passive cooling (no CPU fan)
- Scalability

== Versions ==
=== Sam440ep ===
Sam440ep was the first modular motherboard produced by ACube Systems Srl.

- 400/533/600/667 MHz AMCC PowerPC 440EP SoC processor
- Cache L1/L2: 32KB/-
- 128/256/512 MB 266 MHz DDR SDRAM soldered to the motherboard
- 1× 32-bit, 33 MHz PCI slot
- 1× Flash memory device controller
- 4× USB2 ports, 1× USB1
- 2× Ethernet 10/100 ports
- 4× Serial ATA ports
- Cirrus Logic CS4281 and Realtek ALC655 audio
- ATI Radeon Mobility M9 graphics with 64 MB VRAM, S-Video and DVI out.
- GPIO expansion connector
- Lattice XP expansion FPGA

==== Revision C ====
The specifications are the same as for the revisions before, except for:

- 1× DDR RAM slot supporting up to 512 MB RAM (in place of soldered RAM modules)

=== Sam440ep-flex ===
There is no graphics chip on the Sam440ep-flex, so you have to use a PCI-graphics board.

==== Prototype ====
- 400/533/667 MHz AMCC PowerPC 440EP SoC processor
- Cache L1/L2: 32KB/-
- 512 MB DDR SDRAM soldered to the motherboard
- 1× 32-bit, 66 MHz PCI slot
- 2× 32-bit, 33 MHz PCI slot
- USB 2.0 OHCI/EHCI NXP PCI controller
- 2× Ethernet 10/100 ports
- 4× Serial ATA ports
- Cirrus Logic CS4281 and Realtek ALC655 audio
- GPIO expansion connector
- FPGA Lattice XP with 80 pin I/O expansion connector
- Zigbee module (optional)

==== Revision 1 ====
The specifications are the same as for the flex prototype, except for:

- 2× DDR SDRAM, max 1 GB RAM

==== Revision 2 ====
On 2 April 2009, ACube announced the availability of SAM440ep-flex revision 2, it has the same specifications as the flex prototype except for:

- 667/733/800 MHz AMCC PowerPC 440EP SoC processor (passive cooling, 733 and 800 MHz are achieved by overclocking)
- Cache L1/L2: 32KB/-
- 2× DDR SDRAM, max 1 GB RAM
- RAM clock running at 133 MHz (667 and 800 MHz models) or at 147 MHz (733 MHz models)

== Reception ==
OSNews review provided view by someone who never used AmigaOS computer before: Thom Holwerda commended silent CPU-fan-less operation, but criticized higher price. His evaluation of AmigaOS was mixed; although the platform offered "whole new world of technology to explore and play around with", it was still a relic of the past mainly due to lack of modern features like memory protection and unusual user interface. Review of the Sam440ep in the Amiga Future magazine noted performance comparable to older AmigaOne generation, but criticized non expandable RAM and lack of legacy interfaces (ATA, floppy). Also some features of the new board were still unsupported by AmigaOS (USB 2.0). Testing the 800 MHz variant of the Sam440ep-flex, Amiga Future highlighted CPU speed behind the MicroA1 (750FX 800 MHz), but surpassing it in graphics, memory and harddisk performance.

== See also ==
- Sam460ex
- AmigaOne
- AmigaOne X1000
- Pegasos
