= AmigaOne X1000 =

PowerPC-based personal computer

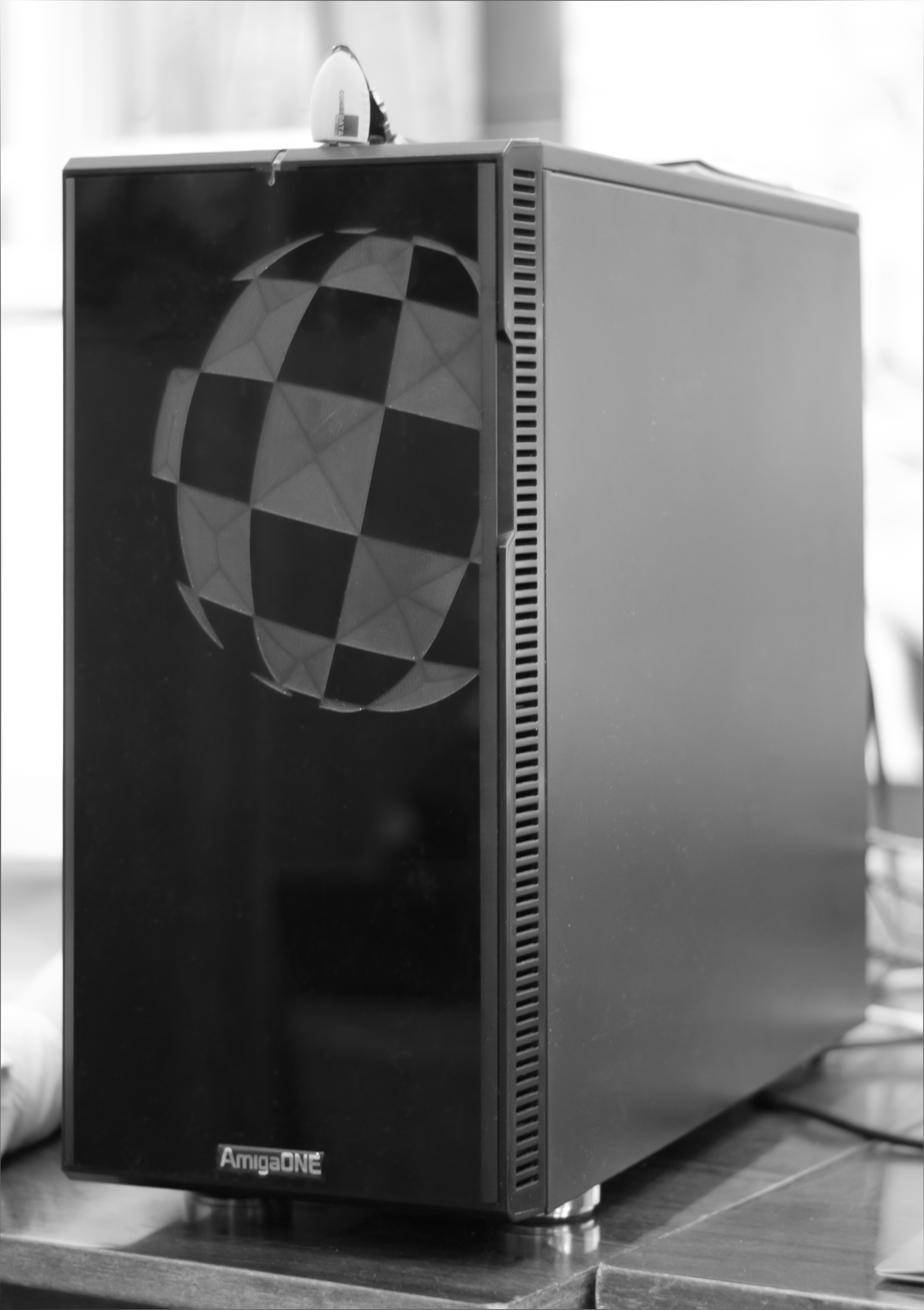
- OS: AmigaOS 4.1 Update 6
- Design firm: Varisys
- Manufacturer: A-Eon Technology
- Type: Workstation / Personal computer
- Processor: 64-bit dual-core PWRficient PA6T-1682M (PowerPC)
- Frequency: 1.8 GHz
- Memory: 4× DDR2 SDRAM slots
- Connection: 10× USB 2.0, 1× Xorro slot, 2× PCIe x16 slots (1x16 or 2x8), 2× PCIe x1 slots, 2× PCI slots, etc
- Ports: 4× SATA Revision 2.0, 1× IDE

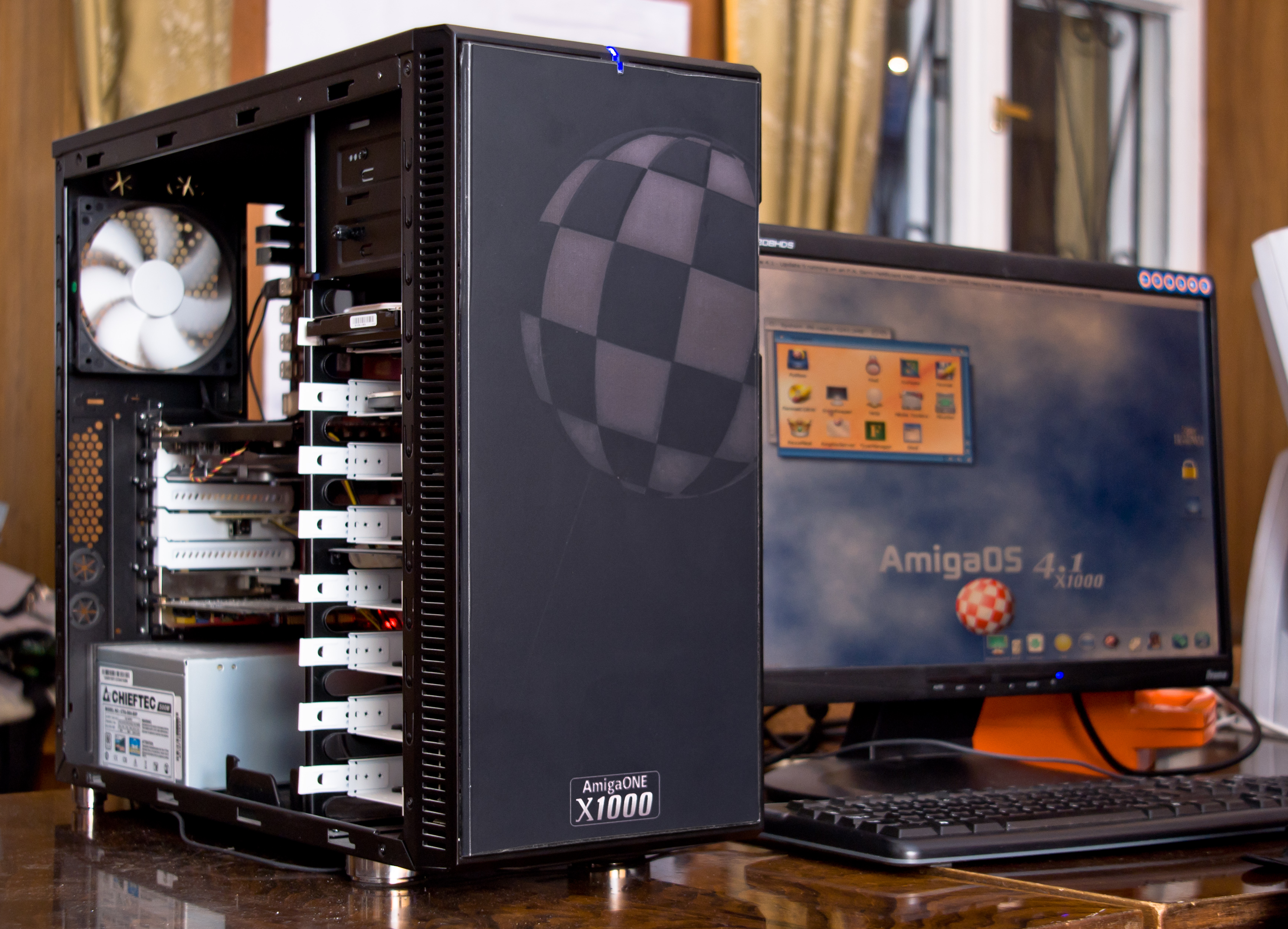
AmigaOne X1000 running AmigaOS 4.1

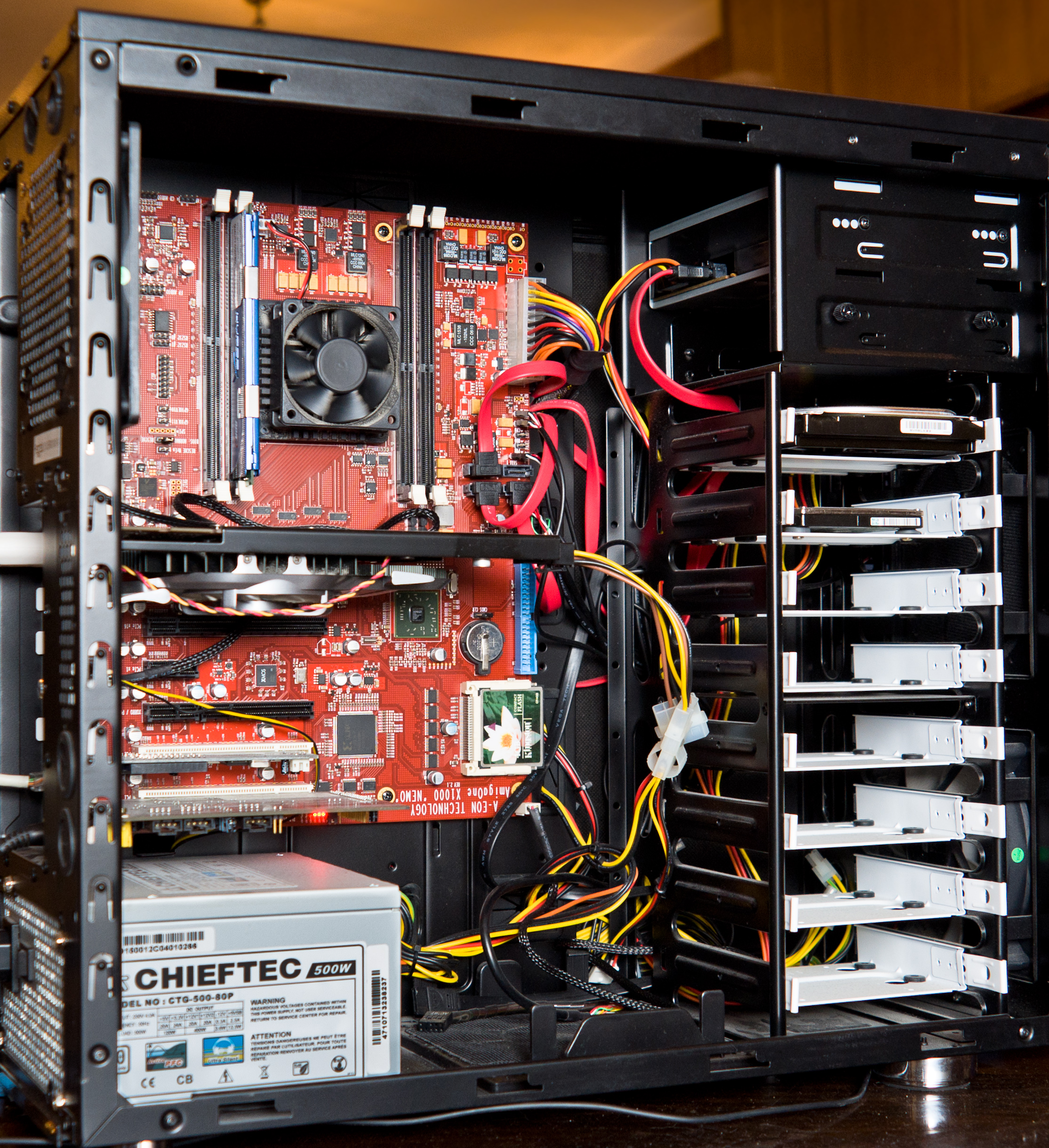
AmigaOne X1000 main board

AmigaOne X1000 is a PowerPC-based personal computer intended as a high-end platform for AmigaOS 4. It was announced by A-Eon Technology CVBA in partnership with Hyperion Entertainment and released in 2011. Its name pays homage to the Amiga 1000 released by Commodore in 1985. It is, however, not hardware-compatible with the original Amiga system.

== History ==
A-Eon Technology is a privately funded company co-founded by Trevor Dickinson. The focus of A-Eon was on the high-end and a partnership with Hyperion Entertainment was formed to allow discussion with key AmigaOS 4 developers about what such a next generation AmigaOS 4 computer would need. With the end of the AmigaONE line from Eyetech and lack of success porting the OS to third party machines, A-Eon decided to continue the AmigaONE line themselves with more up-to-date technology. One important decision made during this early phase was that the AmigaOne X1000 should be a complete system built around a bespoke motherboard with a customised case and peripherals. This contrasts with the adapted reference design strategy used by Eyetech for the original AmigaOne series.

Even before the 'wish list' was completed, hardware design company Varisys had been chosen as a partner based on their track record both with the PowerPC architecture and with parallel computing. The decision to form a partnership with Varisys had the consequence of bringing XMOS chips to the AmigaOne X1000, as it is the connection between XMOS and the Varisys team, dating back to earlier work on the Inmos Transputer, that led to the suggestion of including an XMOS XCore chip on the X1000 motherboard. This XCore chip is referred to by A-Eon as the 'Xena' Coprocessor.

The first prototype machines were manufactured during mid 2009 and Hyperion Entertainment began the process of porting the AmigaOS to the X1000 in late 2009. By mid-June 2010, the X1000 was booting AmigaOS from hard disk and the machine made its debut at the Vintage Computer festival at Bletchley Park on the weekend on the 19 and 20 June 2010.

== Release ==
The original intention was that the machine would be available before Summer 2010, but A-Eon Technology announced at the Vintage Computer festival that the release had been delayed. By August 2011, hardware designer and manufacturer Varisys had begun the first production run of revision 2.1 boards destined for the AmigaOne X1000 beta test team. In January 2012, A-Eon announced that Amiga Kit would start shipping the AmigaOne X1000 to customers with AmigaOS4.1 Update 5. It would also be supplied with a license for AmigaOS4.2 which could be downloaded when it is released by Hyperion Entertainment some years after it was announced.

== Specifications ==
The specifications from A-EON Technology's website:

- Black Pearl PC case, white case also available
- ATX form factor
- Dual-core PWRficient PA6T-1682M 1.8 GHz PowerISA v2.04+ CPU
- Co-processor: "Xena" 500 MHz XCore XS1-L2 124 SDS
- ATI Radeon R700 or AMD Radeon HD 6000 Series graphics card
- Audio: 7.1 channel HD audio
- Memory: 4× DDR2 SDRAM slots
- 10× USB 2.0
- 1× Gigabit Ethernet
- 2× PCIe ×16 slots (1×16 or 2×8)
- 2× PCIe ×1 slots
- 2× PCI slots
- 1× Xorro slot
- 1× Compact Flash
- 2× RS-232
- 4× SATA Revision 2.0 connectors
- 1× PATA connector
- 1× JTAG connector

=== Xena coprocessor ===
The 'Xena' coprocessor is an XMOS XCore MCU integrated on the X1000 motherboard and connected a non-standard expansion slot, called the 'Xorro' slot, named after the Zorro bus used in the Amiga. However, it uses a PCI-express like connector, using a custom I/O layout. The XMOS processor is connected to the local CPU bus in addition to the Xorro slot, allowing timing critical custom hardware to be controlled by the I/O optimized XCore without loading the main processor.

=== Xorro ===
Xorro is a new slot using an industry standard PCIe ×8 form factor to give access to the 'Xena' I/O. This will be the route to Xena's 64 I/O lines, which are dynamically configurable as input, output, or bidirectional. 'Xorro' will allow bridging Xena to external hardware for control purposes, to internal systems, or to other XCore processors. This last point is worth more exploration; XCore is a parallel processing architecture; more XCores can be chained together if more computing power is required.(XK-XMP-64 Development Board). Reference boards have been made with up to 256 cores, offering a theoretical 102.4 BIPS (billion instructions per second).

== Reception ==
A-Eon were able to successfully produce a system that did not have hardware issues (unlike previous AmigaONE boards), and in shipping it in volumes that its detractors claimed would be unlikely. It also took significantly longer to arrive than announced.

The Inquirer criticized its very high price, comparing the X1000 to a golden chocolate teapot with Amiga fanatics as the target market. Amiga Future magazine also mentioned high price along with lack of drivers as main weak points of the fastest hardware available for AmigaOS 4.

Also there was criticism that the Xena chip was simply a 'gimmick' that delivered little to the system, despite many optimistic forecasts of what it could be used for. First use of the new chip is for debugging output of the same computer (no need for second computer).

Finally, the choice of the PA-6T processor has proven controversial. The PA-6T is a dual-core processor, but the second core is not used by AmigaOS.

With the PA6T being an end-of-line CPU, A-EON have announced three new boards, the X3500, X5000/20 and X5000/40 to continue the AmigaOne line using Freescale PowerPC SoC chips. The contract price for developing new motherboard is £1.2 Million

== See also ==
- AmigaOne
- PWRficient
- Common Firmware Environment
- XMOS
