= Amiga support and maintenance software =

Overview of software for Amiga computers

Amiga support and maintenance software performs service functions such as formatting media for a specific filesystem, diagnosing failures that occur on formatted media, data recovery after media failure, and installation of new software for the Amiga family of personal computers—as opposed to application software, which performs business, education, and recreation functions.

The Amiga came with some embedded utility programs, but many more were added over time, often by third-party developers and companies.

== Original utilities ==
Commodore included utility programs with the operating system. Many of these were original features, which were adopted into other systems:

- Installer is a tool for the installation of Amiga software. It features a LISP-like language to handle installations. The Amiga Installer does not support dependencies or track where the installed files are delivered; it simply copies them.
- AmigaGuide is a hypertext markup scheme and a browser for writing and reading web page-like documents. AmigaGuide files are text files in a simple markup language, which facilitates editing and localization in any ASCII text editor. Commodore developed the AmigaGuide format before the World Wide Web was widely known. Consumers who bought Amiga computers in a store did not receive documentation on how to write AmigaGuide documents.

=== Utilities borrowed from other systems ===
- Update tools:
  - Updater is a utility to keep system and third party files up to date
  - AmiUpdate was developed by Simon Archer to keep installed third-party programs up to date.
  - Grunch is a software center for AmigaOS and MorphOS.
  - MorphUP allows MorphOS users to install and update new third-party software.

None of these update systems was widely used by the Amiga community.

== Commodities and utilities ==
Amiga places system utilities in two standard directories:

- The Utilities directory contains programs like IconEdit.
- The Commodities directory (volume SYS:Tools/Commodities/ or SYS:Utilities/Commodities under AmigaOS4) contains executable applet-like utilities which enhance system usability, like for example the ScreenBlanker, the default screen saver shipped with AmigaOS. Commodities are usually loaded at system startup. Many require no interaction and do not feature any GUI interface.
- A system utility called Exchange allows the user to disable, enable, hide, show, and quit Commodities.

== Hard disk partitioning ==
- AmigaOS features a standard centralized utility to partition and format hard disks, called HDToolBox.
- MorphOS uses an updated version of the SCSIConfig utility (since MorphOS version 2, HDConfig) implemented by third party vendor Phase5. In spite of the name, "SCSIConfig" possessed a unique feature at the time, which was providing a consistent mechanism to manage all types of disk interfaces, including IDE, irrespective of which interface the disk(s) in question used.

== Diagnostic tools ==
AmigaOS diagnostic tools are usually programs which display the current state of Exec and AmigaDOS activities.

- Active process explorer: Scout, Ranger
- System calls and messages: SnoopDOS, Snoopium
- Memory management: CyberGuard, Enforcer, MemMungWall, TLSFMem by Chris Hodges
- Virtual memory: GigaMem, VMM
- Benchmark utilities AmiBench, AIBB
- Degrading tools: Degrader (which "degrades" modern Amiga systems to performance and hardware equivalents of legacy Amiga models)

== Promoting tools ==
Promoter and ForceMonitor are utilities that allow the user to control the resolution of Intuition screens for Amiga programs.

== Game loaders ==
WHDLoad is a utility to install legacy Amiga games on a hard disk and load them from Workbench desktop instead of floppies, on which they were often delivered.

jst is an older utility which the developer abandoned in order to concentrate efforts on WHDLoad. Old jstloaders can be read with WHDLoad, and jst itself has some early level of WHDLoad compatibility.

== Command line interfaces and text-based shells ==
The original Amiga CLI (Command Line Interface) had some basic editing capabilities, command templates, and other features such as ANSI compatibility and color selection. In AmigaOS 1.3, the program evolved into a complete text-based shell called AmigaShell, with command history and enhanced editing capabilities.

Third-party developers created improved shells because the console-handler standard command line device driver (or "handler" in Amiga technical language) is independent of the command-line interpreter. This program controlled text-based interfaces into Amiga. Console-handler replacements include KingCON, ViNCEd, and Conman.

Some well-known shells from other platforms were ported to Amiga. These included bash (Bourne Again SHell), CSH (C Shell), and ZSH (Z shell). The shells taken from Unix and Linux were adapted into Amiga and improved with its peculiar capabilities and functions.

The MorphOS Shell is an example of Z shell mixed with the KingCON console handler. It originated as a Unix-like shell and is provided with all the features expected from such a component: AmigaDOS commands (more than 100 commands, most of which are Unix-like), local and global variables, command substitution, command redirection, named and unnamed pipes, history, programmable menus, multiple shells in a window, ANSI compatibility, color selection, and so on. It also includes all the necessary commands for scripting.

== Amiga WIMP GUI interfaces ==
Starting from the original Amiga WIMP standard desktop, Workbench, Amiga interfaces were enhanced by third-party developers. Amiga users are free to replace the original Workbench interface with Scalos and Directory Opus. The standard GUI toolkit, called Intuition, was enhanced in OS2.x with the introduction of GadTools; and third parties created their own toolkits such as Magic User Interface (MUI) (the standard on MorphOS systems) and ClassAct, which evolved into ReAction GUI (the standard GUI on AmigaOS 4.0).

== Amiga Advanced Graphics Systems ==
Many users have added advanced graphics drivers to their Amiga. This lets the AmigaOS handle high resolution graphics, enhanced with millions of colors. Standard GUI interfaces with this capability are CyberGraphX, EGS, and Picasso96.

=== Graphical engines ===
Graphical libraries available on the Amiga include:

- Warp3D, a 3D graphic engine for Amiga
- TinyGL (MorphOS) and MiniGL (AmigaOS), implementations of subsets of the OpenGL graphics engine
- X11, also available through the Amiga versions of Cygnix
- Cairo Vector Library, available on AmigaOS 4 and MorphOS
- SSA (Super Smooth Animation), a proprietary system for playback at 50 Hz or 60 Hz. proDAD Adorage was the first product to use this.
- GTK. On Amiga it is being developed as a GTK_MUI wrapper, to map any existing graphical features of GTK to the standard Magic User Interface (MUI) graphic user interface system.

All Amiga systems can also support the SDL (Simple DirectMedia Layer) cross-platform, multimedia, and free software libraries written in C which creates an abstraction over various platforms' graphics, sound, and input APIs, allowing a developer to write a computer game or other multimedia application once and run it on many operating systems.

=== PostScript ===
Amiga supports PostScript through Ghostscript and SaxonScript (included with Saxon Publisher). Ghostview is the foremost used graphical GUI for GhostScript on the Amiga.

Since AmigaOS 2.1, in the Prefs (Preferences) system directory, there is a printer preferences program called PrinterPS, which allows the use of PostScript printers on the Amiga.

=== TrueType fonts, color and anim fonts ===
Original Amiga outline fonts (also called vector fonts) were Agfa Compugraphic fonts available since AmigaOS 2.0 with the standard utility Fountain (later called IntelliFont) from Commodore. Third-party developers added support for TrueType fonts using various libraries, such as TrueType Library I and II, and LibFreeType library.

The standard diskfont.library also supported bitmap multicolour fonts (ColorFonts), such as the commercial Kara Fonts, or even animated fonts also originally created by Kara Computer Graphics.

=== Font designer software ===
Commodore provided a bitmap font editor called FED. Personal Fonts Maker was the most widely used Amiga software to create bitmap fonts, while TypeSmith v.2.5b was the de facto standard utility to create outline fonts.

== File management ==
=== Backup and recovery ===
In the first Amiga OS releases, Commodore included a standard floppy disk recovery utility called DiskDoctor. Its purpose was to recover files from mangled floppy disks. Unfortunately, this utility worked only with AmigaDOS standard disks. A major fault was that it did not save the recovered data on different disks, rather it saved the info on the original and performed its operations directly on the original. It wrote on original disks and destroyed non-AmigaDOS disks (mainly autobooting games) by overwriting their bootblock. DiskDoctor renamed recovered disks to "Lazarus" (after the resurrected man in the New Testament).

These features were undocumented and led to an Amiga urban legend that there was a computer virus nicknamed the Lazarus Virus, whose final purpose was to make disks unreadable and renaming it with that name. Third-party developers released data recovery programs such as DiskSalv, which was more often used to validate Amiga filesystems on hard disk partitions.

Other Amiga disk repair and backup tools included:

- Floppy only: Disk Mechanic, Disk Repair, Dr. Ami
- Floppy and hard drive: Ami-Back Tools, Ami-Filesafe Pro, Quarterback Tools, Amiga Tools DeLuxe, Diavolo Backup
- Smart File System (SFS): SFS Recover Tool, SFSDoctor, SFSCheck 2, SFSResize 1.0

=== Disk copiers ===
During the 8 bit and 16/32 bit era, copying software was not considered illegal in many countries, and piracy was not perceived as a crime by most users of home computers (usually young people). Commodore 64 and ZX Spectrum software was often copied using cassette decks, while IBM PC, Atari, and Amiga software was typically copied using special programs called disk copiers, both for speed and because especially self-booting floppies often used custom formats or hacks that could not be faithfully reproduced through file-by-file copying. Disk copiers were thus engineered to copy any floppy disk surface byte by byte, often using special, efficient, and advanced techniques of programming and "Disk Track driving" to maintain Floppy Disk read/write head alignment.

In the early days of the Amiga platform, about 16 disk copiers were created in a short amount of time (1985–1989) that enabled copying Amiga floppy disks, including Nibbler, QuickNibble, ZCopier, XCopy/Cachet, FastCopier, Disk Avenger, Tetra Copy (which enabled the user to play Tetris while copying disks), Cyclone, Maverick, D-Copy, Safe II, PowerCopier, Quick Copier, Marauder II (styled as "Marauder //"), Rattle Copy, and BurstNibble.

The legality of such programs was challenged in later years, in countries culturally close to the U.S., via PR campaigns, lobbying and legislation, but in their heyday, disk copiers (like Marauder, X-Copy, and Nibbler) were sold as boxed copies complete with instructions, warranty, and EULAs, like other productivity software.

Some floppy drives included LED track indicators to show if the disks were hacked by the original programmers to support up to track 82 of the disk. There were also copying solutions that included both hardware and software, like Super Card Ami II and Syncro Express I/II/III.

DFC5 could only copy standard AmigaOS formatted disks for backup purposes; however, it multitasked inside of the Amiga Workbench GUI.

X-COPY III, and later the final version, X-COPY Pro, were the most popular Amiga copy programs. They were capable of bit-by-bit copying, also called "nibbling". Although incapable of true multitasking, the programs were capable of taking advantage of Amiga configurations with multiple floppy drives; for instance, on Amiga systems with four floppy drives, X-COPY was capable of simultaneously copying from a source drive to three others. Coupled with excellent bit-by-bit replication capabilities, these features made X-COPY the de facto standard for copying floppy disks on the Amiga.

Another popular copying program was D-COPY, by a Swedish group "D-Mob", which, in spite of some innovative features and better/faster copying routines, failed to gain dominance.

=== Archives and compression utilities ===
The most popular archivers were LhA and LZX. Programs to archive ZIP, Gzip, Bzip2, and RAR files were available but seldom used, and many have an Amiga counterpart, such as 7-Zip. Utilities were available for reading and writing archive formats such as ARC, ARJ (unarchive only), the CAB files common in Windows installation, StuffIt SIT archives from Macintosh, Uuencode (used for encoding binary attachments of e-mail messages), TAR (common on UNIX and Linux), RPM (from Red Hat), and more.

Amiga supported "packed" or "crunched" (meaning compressed) executables, which were common in the age of floppy disks, when disk space and memory conservation was critical. These executable binary files had a decompress routine attached to them that would automatically unpack or decrunch (decompress) the executable upon loading into memory.

The Amiga also included "level depacking", implemented by "Titanics Cruncher", which enabled a binary executable to be decrunched as it was being loaded, requiring a very small amount of memory to do so. In general, packing and crunching was taken from the Commodore 64 cracking scene. Some crunchers, such as Time Cruncher, were "ported" from Commodore 64, displaying the same visual effects during decrunching. The CPU in the Amiga was completely different from the one in the Commodore 64, requiring a complete rewrite.

Noteworthy were TurboImploder and PowerPacker, as they were easy to use, with graphical interfaces. Other popular crunchers were DefjamPacker, TetraPack, DoubleAction, Relokit, StoneCracker, Titanics and CrunchMania. The ability to compress and decompress single files and directories on the fly has been present on the AmigaOS since at least 1994.

A similar feature was implemented relatively recently as a property in the ZFS filesystem.

The AmigaOS packers and cruncher libraries are centralized by using the XPK system. The XPK system consists of a master library and several (de)packer sublibraries. Programs use only the master library directly, while sublibraries (akin to plug-ins) implement the actual (de)compression. When unpacking/decrunching, the applications do not need to know which library was used to pack or crunch the data. XPK is a wrapper for crunchers; to decrunch non-XPK packed formats requires XFD.

Another important invention on the Amiga platform was the ADF format for creating images of Amiga floppy disks, either standard AmigaDOS floppies or non-DOS ("NDOS") ones, for use in Amiga emulators, such as WinUAE. Amiga emulators and AmigaOS (with third-party software) can use these files as if they were virtual floppy disks. Unlimited virtual floppies could be created on modern Amigas, although WinUAE on a real PC can handle only four at a time, the maximum number of floppy drives that the Amiga hardware could have connected at any one time.

All the popular Amiga compression implementations and archive files are now centralized and implemented by a single system library called XAD, which has a front-end GUI named Voodoo-X. It is included in AmigaOS 3.9 and up with UnArc. This library is modular and can handle more than 80 compression formats.

=== Filesystems ===
Amiga can use various filesystems. The historical standards are the original Amiga filesystem, called the Old File System. This was good for floppy disks but wasted space on hard disks and is considered obsolete.

The Fast File System (FFS) can handle file names up to 30 characters, has international settings (it can optionally recognise upper- and lower-case accented letters as equivalent) and could also be cached, if the users chose to format the partition with the cache option. The FFS filesystem evolved into FFS2.

Modern journaling file systems for Amiga are the Smart File System (SFS) and Professional File System (PFS).

The MultiUser File System (MuFS) supports multiple users. Using MuFS the owner of the system could grant various privileges on files by creating privileges for groups and users. It was first available with the Ariadne Ethernet card, and later standalone. The Professional File System suite has a utility to let PFS to be patched to support MuFS and MuFS features. The latest version is 1.8 and was released in 2001.

CrossDOS is a utility to read MS-DOS formatted floppy disks in FAT12 and FAT16 filesystem, either 720 KiB double-density format or high-density (1440 KiB) (on connected floppy drives that can read 1440 MS-DOS disks). It is a commercial product, and a slightly cut-down version was included with AmigaOS beginning with version 2.1.

The FAT95 library recognizes partitions of various filesystems common in other systems such as FAT16 and FAT32. It also reads DOS floppies and USB pen drives formatted with FAT16 or FAT32.

Filesystems like ext2 for Linux, NTFS from Microsoft, and more are supported by third-party developers.

MorphOS natively supports SFS, FFS/FFS2, PFS, MacOS HFS, HFS+, Linux Ext2, FAT16, FAT32, and NTFS filesystems.

=== Data/file types ===
The Datatype system of AmigaOS is a centralized, expandable, modular system describing any kind of file (text, music, image, videos). Each has a standard load/save module.

Any experienced programmer, using the Amiga Datatype programming guidelines, could create new standard datatype modules. The module could be left visible to the whole Amiga system (thus to all Amiga programs) by copying the datatype into the system directory SYS:Classes/DataTypes/, and the descriptor (used to identify files) into DEVS:DataTypes/.

This allows programs to load and save any files for which the corresponding datatypes exist. File descriptors did not need to be embedded in the executable code. An independent system of loaders was not needed for new productivity software. Amiga productivity software tools therefore have a smaller size and a more clean design than similar programs running in other operating systems.

Supported Amiga datatypes include:

- AIFF
- JPEG
- PNG
- TIFF
- IFF ANIM
- CDXL
- BMP
- GIF (still and animated)
- JNG
- HTML
- 8SVX
- HyperGuide
- ILBM
- MPEG audio
- MPEG video
- PBM
- Microsoft Word
- PhotoCD
- Protracker
- RGBx
- RIFF WAVE
- WordPerfect
- WordStar
- XBM
- SSA proDAD

=== MultiView ===
MultiView is the Amiga universal viewer. It can load and display any file for which a corresponding datatype exists.

=== MIME types ===
Modern Amiga-like operating systems such as AmigaOS 4.0 and MorphOS can handle also MIME types. Any kind of file, due to its peculiar characteristics (thanks to filename extensions), or data embedded into the file itself (for example into file header) can be associated with a program that handle it, and this feature improves and completes the capabilities of Amiga to recognize and deal with any kind of file.

== Device support ==
=== USB ===
The only known historical USB stack for the Amiga was created for the MacroSystem DraCo Amiga clone. It supported only USB 1.0 and ceased with the demise of that platform.

Modern USB support drivers for Amiga are:

- Poseidon USB stack available for AmigaOS 3, AROS, and MorphOS by Chris Hodges (open-source software). Poseidon has a modular approach to USB, and various hardware devices are supported by a certain number of HID devices.
- Sirion USB stack of AmigaOS 4.0
- ANAIIS (Another Native Amiga IO Interface Stack) by Gilles Pelletier

=== FireWire (IEEE 1394) ===
The only known historical Amiga support for FireWire was built for the DraCo Amiga clone by Macrosystem.

Only one FireWire interface exists for Amiga. It is named Fireworks, and it was created for the MorphOS system by programmer Pavel Fedin. It is still in an early stage of development and is freely downloadable.

=== Printer drivers ===
The print manager program TurboPrint, by German firm IrseeSoft, is the de facto standard for advanced printing on the Amiga. It is a modular program with many drivers which support many modern printers. PrintStudio Professional I and II are another well known printer driver system for the Amiga.

PrintManager v39 by Stephan Rupprecht, available at the Aminet repository, is a print spooler for AmigaOS 3.x and 4.0.

=== Video digitizers ===
Video digitizing includes DigiView; the FrameMachine Zorro II expansion card for A2000, 3000, 4000; the Impact Vision IV24 from GVP; the VidiAmiga real time digitizer; and the Paloma module for the Picasso IV graphics card.

=== Graphic Tablets ===
In the 1980s, SummaGraphics tablets were common. Summagraphics directly supported Amiga with its drivers.

In 1994, GTDriver (Graphic Tablet Driver) was the most common driver for serial port tablets, like Summagraphics MM, Summagraphics Bitpadone, CalComp 2000, Cherry, TekTronix 4967, and WACOM. It could also be used as a mouse driver.

Graphics tablets now are mainly USB devices and are automatically recognized by Amiga USB stacks. The most widely used driver for graphic tablets is FormAldiHyd. FormAldiHyd can be used with Aiptek, Aldi, Tevion, and WACOM IV (Graphire, ArtPad, A3, A4, A5, and PenPartner) graphic tablets.

The Poseidon USB driver, written by the same author as FormAldiHyd, Chris Hodges, directly supports USB graphics tablets, including ones more modern than FormAldiHyd.

=== Scanner drivers ===
Amiga programs often have scanner drivers embedded in their interface and are limited to some ancient scanner models. One example is Art Department Professional (ADPro).

In recent times, scanner management is managed by the Amiga Poseidon USB stack. Poseidon detects scanners from their signature, and loads the corresponding HIDD scanner module. The graphical interface is managed by programs like ScanTrax and ScanQuix.

=== Genlocks, chromakey, signal video inverters ===
The Amiga has special circuitry to support a genlock signal and chromakey. Genlock software vendors included GVP (Great Valley Products) (an American hardware manufacturer) and Hama, Electronic Design, and Sirius genlocks from Germany.

=== Infrared/remote controls ===
The IRCom class is a driver that supports the IRCom standard and is available for the USB Poseidon Stack.

Pegasos computers have an internal IrDA port connector for connecting infrared devices, but MorphOS offers no support for it. The internal IrDA port can be used by installing Linux.

=== WiFi and Bluetooth ===
The Amiga can use WiFi external routers connected physically through Ethernet cable and talk with remote WiFi devices. Drivers are available for Prism2 internal PCI and PCMCIA WiFi expansion cards, but there are no drivers for Bluetooth standard devices like mobile phones, Bluetooth handsets, keyboards, or mice.

A USB class exists for the Poseidon stack to use the "Wireless PC Lock" USB device by Sitecom Europe BV and engage its security functions. It is called Wireless PC Lock.

=== Others ===
In the past, drivers and hardware cards were available to drive the Polaroid Freeze Frame Digital Camera System Polaroid Digital Palette CI-3000 and Digital Palette CI 5000, with Polaroid software.

Drivers for single-frame video recorders allow users to save on tape the 3D animations created on the Amiga using Ampex and Betacam devices. Also available are time-base correctors (TBCs), a family of devices correcting timing errors; one was the Personal TBC series.

The Amiga helped to create and launch digital recorders coupled with an internal hard disk and a DVD drive for file transfer. One was Broadcaster Elite, one of the first digital video recorders, based on a SCSI system and a Zorro II Amiga expansion card.

Expansion cards could transform an Amiga into a waveform monitor or vectorscope.

The Phonepak card from GVP transformed the Amiga into a telephone switchboard, fax system, and SOHO (small office/home office) answering machine.

The Amiga was used as a video titler system in the experimental era of high-definition television. A battery of three Amigas was used as a video titler on analog HDTV experiments on HDTV NTSC 1125 lines standard, by channels like ESPN, ABC, and NBC.

== See also ==
- Amiga productivity software
- Amiga music software
- Amiga programming languages
- Amiga Internet and communications software
