= AmigaOS version history =

History of the AmigaOS operating system

AmigaOS is the proprietary native operating system of the Amiga personal computer. Since its introduction with the launch of the Amiga 1000 in 1985, there have been four major versions and several minor revisions of the operating system.

Initially the Amiga operating system had no strong name and branding, as it was simply considered an integral part of the Amiga system as a whole. Early names used for the Amiga operating system included "CAOS" (which stood for "Commodore Amiga Operating System") and "AmigaDOS". Another non-official name was "Workbench", from the name of the Amiga desktop environment, which was included on a floppy disk named "Amiga Workbench".

Version 3.1 of the Amiga operating system was the first version to be officially referred to as "Amiga OS" (with a space between "Amiga" and "OS") by Commodore.

Version 4.0 of the Amiga operating system was the first version to be branded as a less generic "AmigaOS" (without the space).

What many consider the first versions of AmigaOS (Workbench 1.0 up to 3.0) are here indicated with the Workbench name of their original disks.

== Kickstart/Workbench 1.0, 1.1, 1.2, 1.3 ==
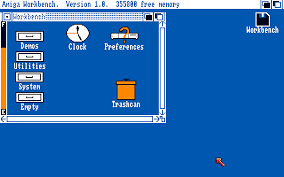
Amiga Workbench 1.0

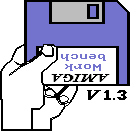
Amiga boot screen (Kickstart 1.3)

Workbench 1.0 was released for the first time in October 1985. The 1.x series of Workbench defaults to a distinctive blue and orange color scheme, designed to give high contrast on even the worst of television screens (the colors can be changed by the user). Version 1.1 consists mostly of bug fixes and, like version 1.0, was distributed only for the Amiga 1000. The entire Workbench operating system consisted of three floppy disks: Kickstart, Workbench and ABasic by MetaComCo.

The Amiga 1000 needed a Kickstart disk to be inserted into floppy drive to boot up. An image of a simple illustration of a hand on a white screen, holding a blue Kickstart floppy, invited the user to perform this operation. After the kickstart was loaded into a special section of memory called the writable control store (WCS), the image of the hand appeared again, this time inviting the user to insert the Workbench disk.

Workbench version 1.2 was the first to support Kickstart stored in a ROM. A Kickstart disk was still necessary for Amiga 1000 models; it was no longer necessary for Amiga 500 or 2000, but the users of these systems had to change the ROMs (which were socketed) to change the Kickstart version.

Workbench now spanned two floppy disks, and supported installing and booting from a hard drive (assuming the Amiga was equipped with one), the name of the main disk was still named "Workbench" (which is also the user interface portion of the operating system). The second disk was the Extras disk. The system now shipped with AmigaBasic by Microsoft, the only software Microsoft ever wrote for the Amiga.

Kickstart version 1.2 corrected various flaws and added AutoConfig support. AutoConfig is a protocol similar to and is the predecessor of Plug and Play, in that it can configure expansion boards without user intervention.

Kickstart version 1.3 improved little on its predecessor, the most notable change being auto booting from hard drives. Workbench 1.3, on the other hand, users can find several significant improvements to Workbench, including FFS a faster file system for hard disks storage which resolved the problem of old Amiga filesystem which wasted too much hard disk space due to the fact it could store only 488 bytes in any block of 512 bytes keeping 24 bytes for checksums. Many improvements were made to the CLI (command line interface) of Amiga which was now a complete text based Shell, named AmigaShell, and various additional tools and programs.

== Kickstart/Workbench 1.4 ==
Kickstart/Workbench 1.4 was a beta version of the upcoming 2.0 update and never released, but the Kickstart part was shipped in very small quantities with early Amiga 3000 computers, where it is often referred to as the "Superkickstart ROM". In these machines it is only used to bootstrap the machine and load the Kickstart that will be used to actually boot the system. The appearance of a very early first release of 1.4 was similar to 1.3, but with colors slightly changed. A second version was similar to that of 2.0 and higher, with just minor differences. It is, however, possible to dump out of the OS selection screen by clicking where one would expect to see a close gadget. This will cause the machine to boot Kickstart 1.4 using either the wb_2.x: partition, or from a floppy.

== Workbench 2.0, 2.04, 2.05, 2.1 ==
Workbench 2.0 was released in 1990 and introduced a lot of improvements and major advances to the GUI of the overall Amiga operating system. The harsh blue and orange colour scheme was replaced with a much easier on the eye grey and light blue with 3D aspect in the border of the windows. The Workbench was no longer tied to the 640×256 (PAL) or 640×200 (NTSC) display modes, and much of the system was improved with an eye to making future expansion easier. For the first time, a standardised "look and feel" was added. This was done by creating the Amiga Style Guide, and including libraries and software which assisted developers in making conformant software. Technologies included the GUI element creation library gadtools, the software installation scripting language Installer, and the AmigaGuide hypertext help system.

Workbench 2.04 introduced ARexx, a system-wide scripting language. Programmers could add so-called "ARexx ports" to their programs, which allowed them to be controlled from ARexx scripts. Using ARexx, you could make two completely different programs from different vendors work together seamlessly. For example, you could batch-convert a directory of files to thumbnail images with an ARexx-capable image-manipulation program, create and index HTML table of the thumbnails linking to the original images, and display it in a web browser, all from one script. ARexx became very popular, and was widely adopted by programmers.

The AmigaDOS, previously written in BCPL and very difficult to develop for beyond basic file manipulation, was mostly rewritten in C.

Unfortunately, some badly written software – especially games – failed to run with 2.x, and so a lot of people were upset with this update. Most often, the failure occurred because programmers had used directly manipulated private structures maintained by the operating system, rather than using official function calls. Many users circumvented the problem by installing so-called "kickstart switchers", a small circuit board which held both a Kickstart 1.3 and 2.0 chip, with which they could switch between Kickstart versions.

2.x shipped with the A500+ (2.04), A600 (2.05), A3000 and A3000T. Workbench 2.1 was the last in this series, and only released as a software update. It included useful features such as CrossDOS, to support working with floppy disks formatted for PCs. Since 2.1 was a software-only release, there was no Kickstart 2.1 ROM.

2.x also introduced PCMCIA card support, for the slot on the A600.

Workbench 2.1 introduced also a standard hypertext markup language for easily building guides for the user or help files, or manuals. It was called AmigaGuide. Release 2.1 was also the first Workbench release to feature a system-standard localization system, allowing the user to make an ordered list of preferred languages; when a locale-aware application runs, it asks the operating system to find the catalog (a file containing translations of the application's strings) best matching the user's preferences.

== Amiga OS 3.0, 3.1 ==
Amiga Workbench 3

Amiga OS 3.0 was released in 1992 and version 3.1 between 1993 (for the CD32) and 1994 (for other Amiga models). Amiga OS 3.1 was the last version released by Commodore.

The 3.x series added support for new Amiga models. Other new features included:

- A universal data system, known as DataTypes, that allowed programs to load pictures, sound, text and other content in formats they didn't understand directly, through the use of standard plugs (see object-oriented operating system) (3.0)
- Better color remapping for high-color display modes and support for the new AGA chipset. (3.0)
- Improved visual appearance for Workbench desktop. (3.0)
- CD-ROM support as required for Amiga CD32. (3.1)

3.x shipped with the CD32, A1200, A4000 and A4000T.

== AmigaOS 3.5, 3.9 ==
Workbench 3.9

TCP/IP stacks

After the demise of Commodore, Workbench 3.5 was released on 18 October 1999 and Workbench 3.9 in December 2000 by German company Haage & Partner, which was granted the license to update the Amiga operating system by its new owners. Whereas all previous OS releases ran on Motorola 68000, AmigaOS 3.5 onwards required a 68020 or better, CD-ROM and at least 4 MB RAM. Unlike previous releases, 3.5 and 3.9 were released on CD-ROM. Kickstart 3.1 was also required, as the operating system didn't include the new ROM.

Updates included:

- Supplied with TCP/IP stack (unregistered time-limited free MiamiDX demo in 3.5, unrestricted AmiTCP in 3.9), web browser (AWeb), and e-mail client
- Improved GUI and new toolkit called "ReAction"
- AVI/MPEG movie player (OS3.9)
- New partitioning software to support hard disks larger than 4 GB
- HTML documentation in English and German
- MP3 and CD audio player (OS3.9)
- Dock program (OS3.9)
- Improved Workbench with asynchronous features
- Find utility (OS3.9)
- Unarchiving system called XAD (OS3.9)
- WarpOS PowerPC kernel to support PowerUP accelerator boards

== AmigaOS 3.1.4, 3.2 ==
AmigaOS 3.1.4 was released in September 2018 by Hyperion Entertainment with many fixes and enhancements. In particular, support of larger hard drives including at bootup; the entire line of Motorola 680x0 CPUs up to (and including) the Motorola 68060; and a modernized Workbench with a new, optional icon set. The version number caused some confusion in the community as it was released after AmigaOS 3.5, 3.9, and even 4.x, but relates to the fact that the codebase is a clean slate building from the original 3.1 source code from Commodore. The source code for both 3.5 and 3.9 by Haage & Partner could not legally be used due to licensing reasons, and 4.x is built and reserved for the PowerPC platform. Unlike AmigaOS 3.5, AmigaOS 3.1.4 still supports the Motorola 68000 CPU, thus the complete range of classic Amiga computers.

In May 2021, Hyperion Entertainment released AmigaOS 3.2, which includes all features of the previous version (3.1.4.1) and adds several new improvements such as support for ReAction GUI, management of Amiga Disk File images, help system and improved datatypes.

== AmigaOS 4 ==
AmigaOS 4.0 GUI: Workbench 4.0^{[5]}

A new version of AmigaOS was released on December 24, 2006, after five years of development by Hyperion Entertainment (Belgium) under license from Amiga, Inc. for AmigaOne registered users.

During the five years of development, users of AmigaOne machines could download from Hyperion repository Pre-Release Versions of AmigaOS 4.0 as long as these were made available. As witnessed by many users into Amiga discussion forum sites, these versions were stable and reliable, despite the fact that they are technically labeled as "pre-releases".

Last stable version of AmigaOS 4.0 for AmigaOne computers is the "July 2007 Update", released for download 18 July 2007 to the registered users of AmigaOne machines.^{[1]}

AmigaOS 4 Classic was released commercially for older Amiga computers with CyberstormPPC and BlizzardPPC accelerator cards in November 2007. It had previously been available only to developers and beta-testers.

=== Version 4.0 ===
The new version is PowerPC-native, finally abandoning the Motorola 68k processor. AmigaOS 4.0 will run on some PowerPC hardware, which currently only includes A1200, A3000 and A4000 with PowerPC accelerator boards and AmigaOne motherboards. Amiga, Inc.'s distribution policies for AmigaOS 4.0 and any later versions require that for third-party hardware the OS must be bundled with it, with the sole exception of Amigas with Phase 5 PowerPC accelerator boards, for which the OS will be sold separately.

AmigaOS 4.0 Final introduced a new memory system based on the slab allocator.

Features, among others:

- Fully skinnable GUI
- Virtualized memory
- Integrated viewer for PDF and other document formats
- Support for PowerPC (native) and 68k (interpreted/JIT) applications
- New drivers for various hardware
- New memory allocation system
- Support for file sizes larger than 2 GB
- Integrated Picasso 96 2D Graphics API
- Integrated Warp3D 3D Graphics API

=== Version 4.1 ===
AmigaOS 4.1^{[5]} was presented to the public July 11, 2008, and went on sale September 2008.

This is a new version and not only a simple update as it features, among others:

- Memory paging ^{[2]}^{[3]}
- JXFS filesystem with the support for drives and partitions of multiple terabyte size
- Hardware compositing engine (Radeon R1xx and R2xx family)
- Implementation of the Cairo device-independent 2D rendering library
- New and improved DOS functionality (full 64 bit support, universal notification support, automatic expunge and reload of updated disk resources)
- Improved 3D hardware accelerated screen-dragging

== See also ==
- Kickstart versions
