= Floppy disk variants =

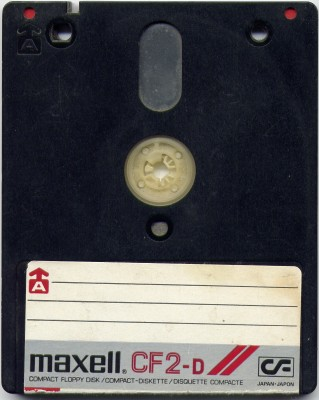
A Maxell-branded 3-inch Compact Floppy Disk

The floppy disk is a data storage and transfer medium that was ubiquitous from the mid-1970s well into the 2000s. In addition to the four common generations of floppy disks (and drives), many other floppy disk formats were developed, either using a different disk design or special layout and encoding methods for the data held on the disk. Some with limited adoption were failed attempts to establish a standard for a next generation.

== Non-standard media and devices ==
=== Burroughs 8-inch Drive and Media ===
From 1976 until 1984 Burroughs offered a line of two sided 8-inch floppy disks and drives on its systems, initially at 1.0 MB and then at 3.0 MB. They were not compatible with the then industry standard 8-inch disk or drive. The 3.0 MB version used a servomechanism to achieve its higher-capacity.

=== IBM DemiDiskette ===
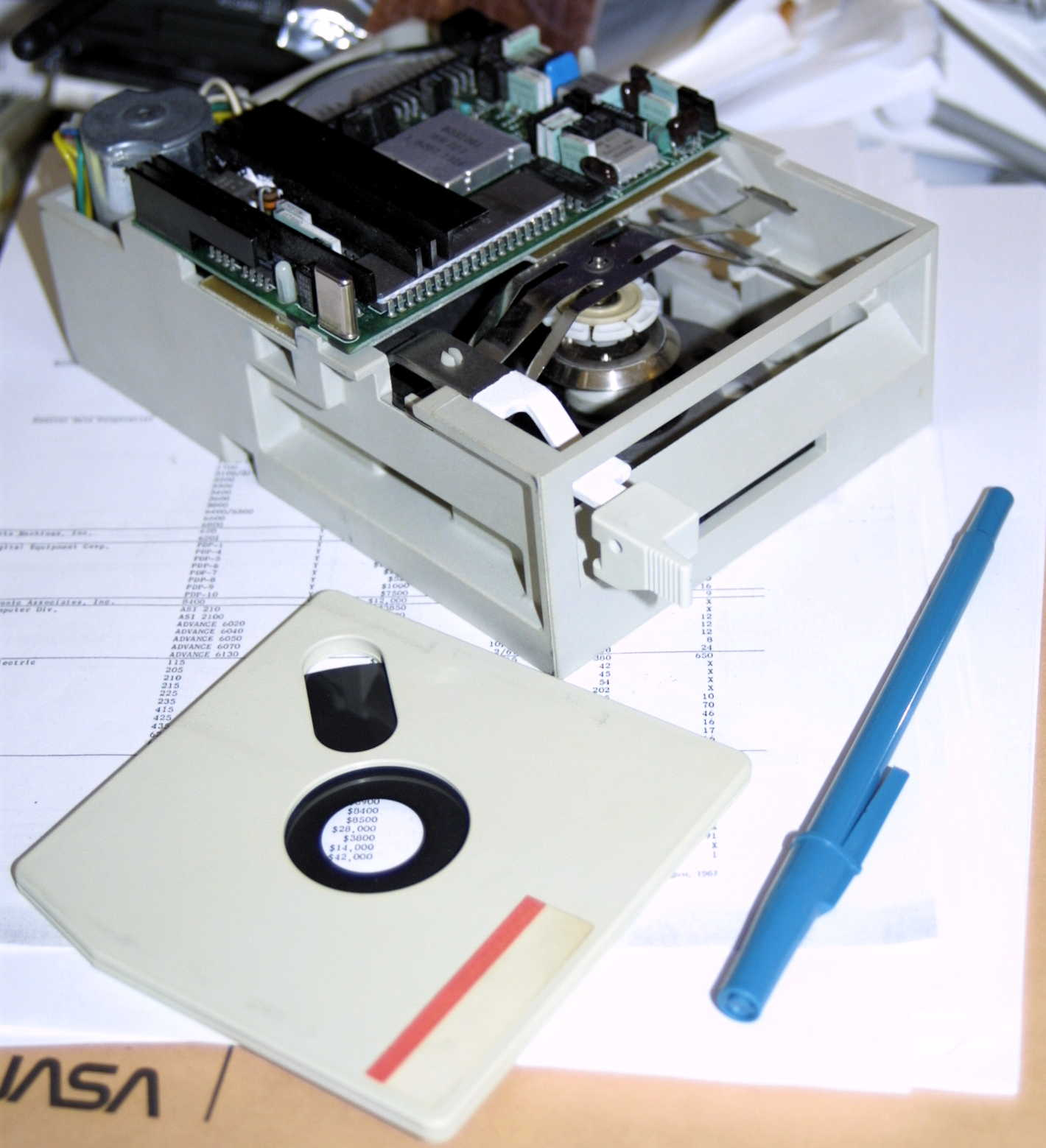
IBM DemiDiskette media and Model 341 FDD

In the early 1980s, IBM Rochester developed a 4-inch floppy disk drive, the Model 341 and an associated diskette, the DemiDiskette. At about half the size of the original 8-inch floppy disk the name derived from the prefix demi for "half". This program was driven by aggressive cost goals, but missed the pulse of the industry. The prospective users, both inside and outside IBM, preferred standardization to what by release time were small cost reductions, and were unwilling to retool packaging, interface chips and applications for a proprietary design. The product was announced and withdrawn in 1983 with only a few units shipped. IBM wrote off several hundred million dollars of development and manufacturing facility.

=== Tabor Drivette ===
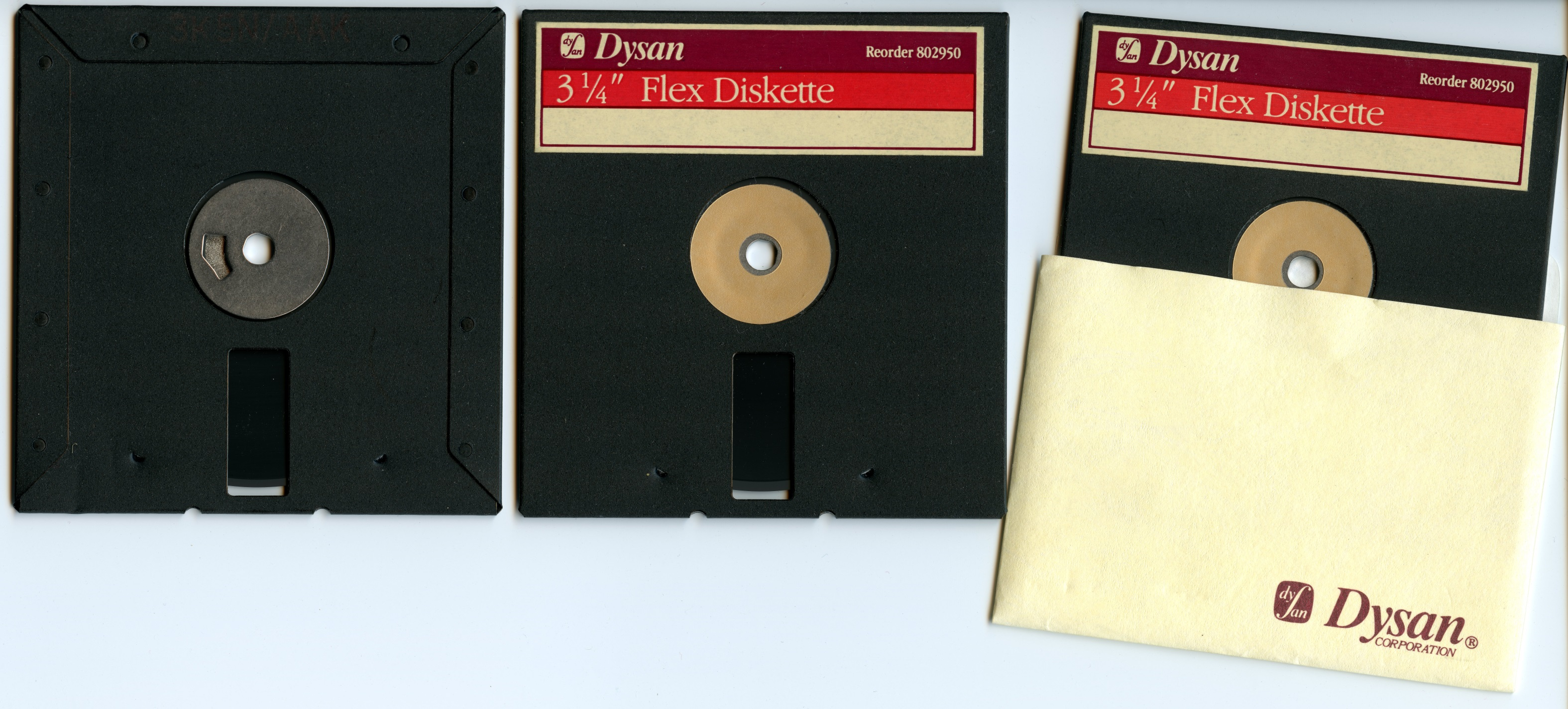
Dysan 3¼" Flex Diskettes (P/N 802950)

Another unsuccessful diskette variant was the Drivette, a 3¼-inch diskette drive marketed by Tabor Corporation of Westland, Massachusetts, USA between 1983 and 1985 with media supplied by Dysan, Brown and 3M. The diskettes were named Dysan 3¼" Flex Diskette (P/N 802950), Tabor 3¼" Flex Diskette (P/N D3251), sometimes also nicknamed "Tabor" or "Brown" at tradeshows. The Microfloppy Disk Drive TC 500 was a single-sided quad-density drive with a nominal storage capacity of 500 KB (80 tracks, 140 tpi, 16 sectors, 300 rpm, 250 kbit/s, 9,250 bpi with MFM). It could work with standard controllers for 5¼-inch floppy disks. Since August 1984, it was used in the Seequa Chameleon 325, an early CP/M-80 & MS-DOS portable computer with both Z80 and 8088 processors. It was also offered in limited quantity with some PDP-11/23-based workstations by General Scientific Corporation. Originally, Educational Microcomputer Systems (EMS) announced a system using this drive as well, but later changed plans to use 3½-inch diskette drives instead.

=== 3-inch "MCD-1 Micro Cassette" ===
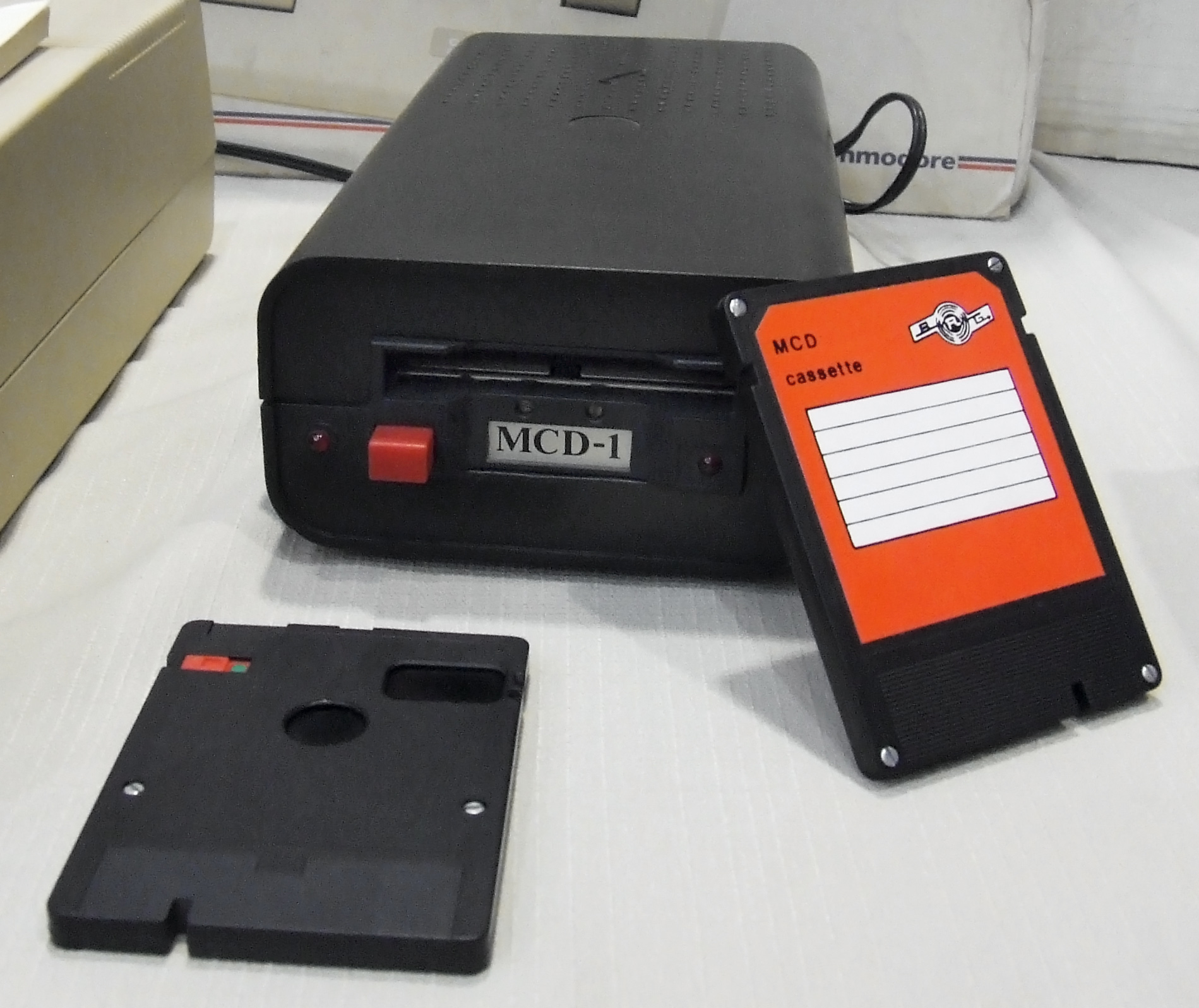
MCD-1 drive and disk cassettes

A magnetic disk in a hard plastic shell was invented by Marcell Jánosi, who was working at the Hungarian Budapest Radio Technology Factory (Budapesti Rádiótechnikai Gyár, BRG), in 1973. In 1982, such a product, the 3-inch MCD-1 was announced internationally and Jack Tramiel showed interest in using the technology in his Commodore computers, but negotiations fell through. Versions of the floppy drive were released in minimal quantity for the ZX Spectrum and Commodore 64, and some computers made in East Germany were also equipped with one. The floppies are single sided and can hold up to 149 KB of data when MFM formatted. The drives were compatible with contemporary floppy controllers. Production was very limited in the early 1980s due to manufacturing problems and the product was abandoned by 1984 after the industry adopted a standard 3.5 inch format.

=== 3-inch "Compact Floppy Disk" / "CF-2" format ===
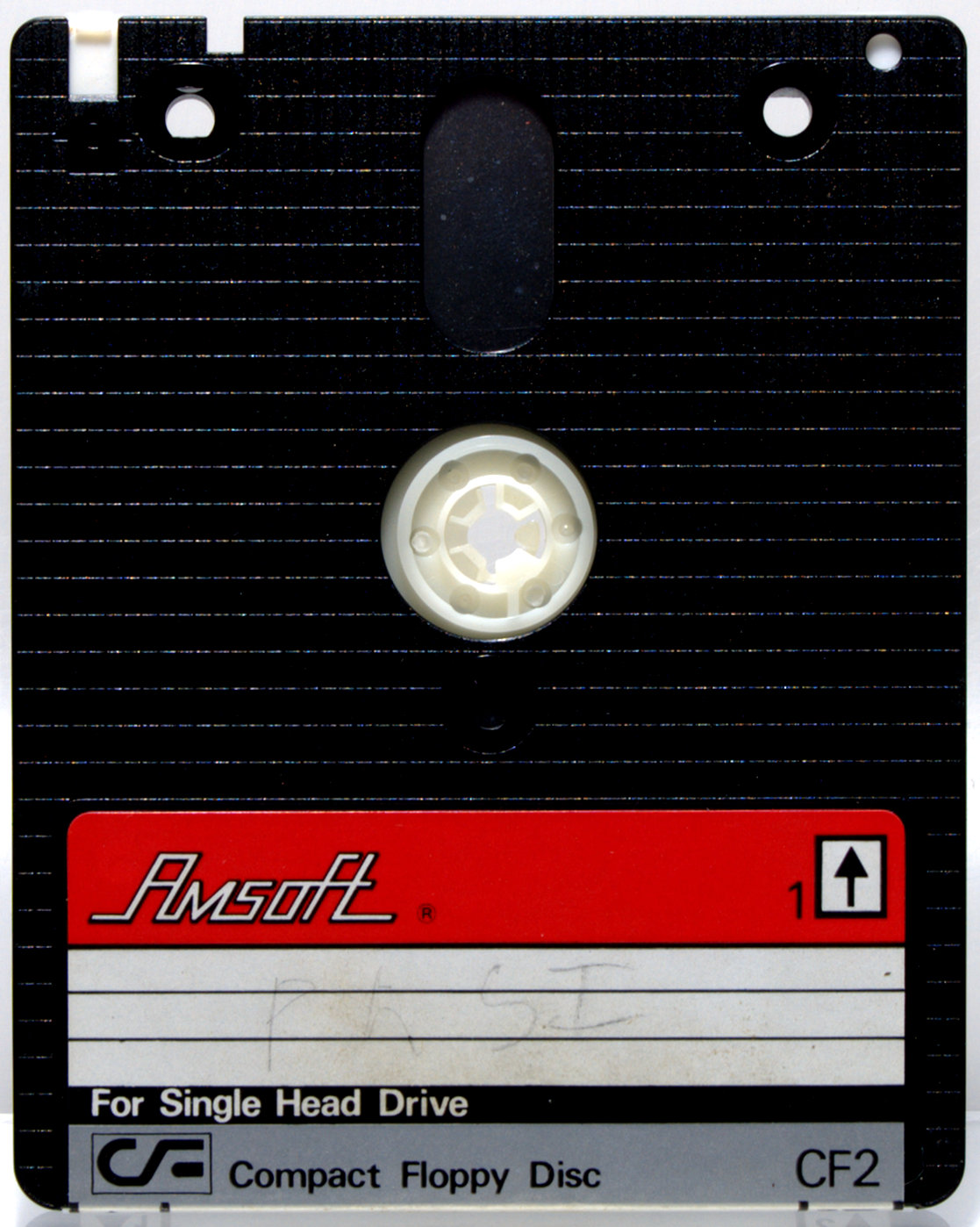
A 3-inch floppy disk by Amstrad. This format was used by their CPC and Spectrum lines and in some systems by other manufacturers.

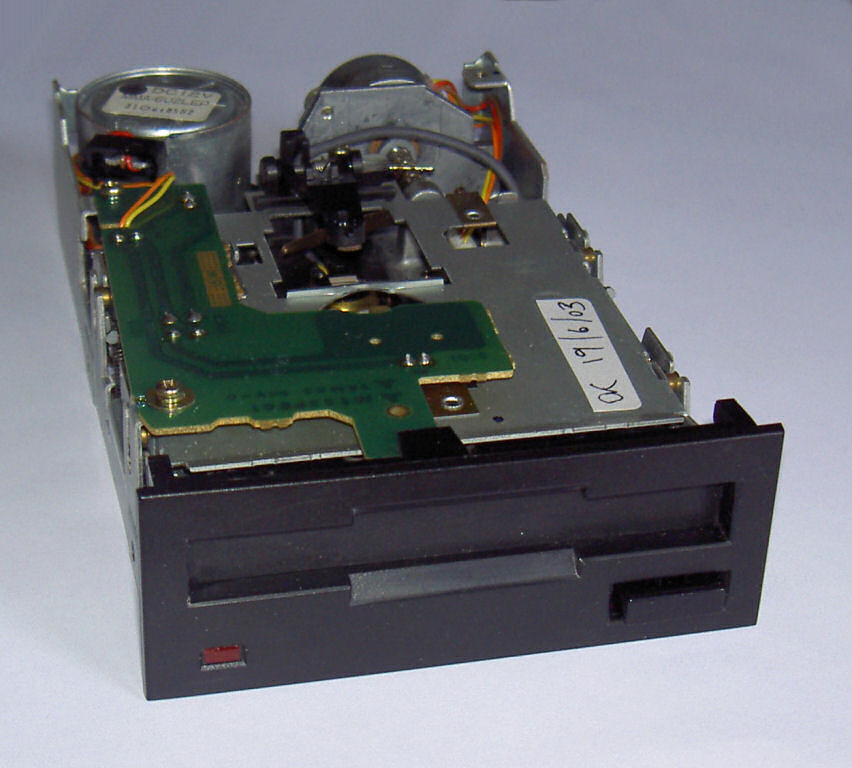
An Amstrad 3-inch floppy drive

An Amstrad CPC loading a game from floppy disk

The 3-inch "Compact Floppy Disk" or "CF-2" was an intended rival to Sony's 3.5" floppy system introduced by a consortium of manufacturers led by Matsushita. Hitachi was a manufacturer of 3-inch disk drives, and stated in advertisements, "It's clear that the 3" floppy will become the new standard."

The format was widely used by Amstrad in their CPC and PCW computers, and (after Amstrad took over manufacture of the line) the Sinclair ZX Spectrum +3. It was also adopted by some first-party manufacturers/systems such as Sega, Yamaha, the Oric, the Tatung Einstein, and Timex of Portugal in the FDD and FDD-3000 disk drives and a number of third-party vendors such as Amdek, AMS, and Cumana who provided drives for use with the Apple II, Atari 8-bit computers, BBC Micro, and TRS-80 Color Computer. Despite this, the format was not a major success.

Three-inch diskettes bear much similarity to the 3 1/2-inch size, but with some unique features. One example is the more elongated plastic casing, taller than a 3 1/2-inch disk, but less wide and thicker (i.e. with increased depth). The actual 3-inch magnetic-coated disk occupies less than 50% of the space inside the casing, the rest being used by the complex protection and sealing mechanisms implemented on the disks, which thus are largely responsible for the thickness, length, and relatively high costs of the disks. On the early Amstrad machines (the CPC line and the PCW 8256), the disks are typically flipped over to change the side (acting like 2 separate single-sided disks, comparable to the "flippy disks" of 5 1/4-inch media) as opposed to being contiguously double-sided. Double-sided mechanisms were introduced on the later PCW 8512 and PCW 9512, thus removing the need to remove, flip, and then reinsert the disk.

=== Quick Disk variants ===
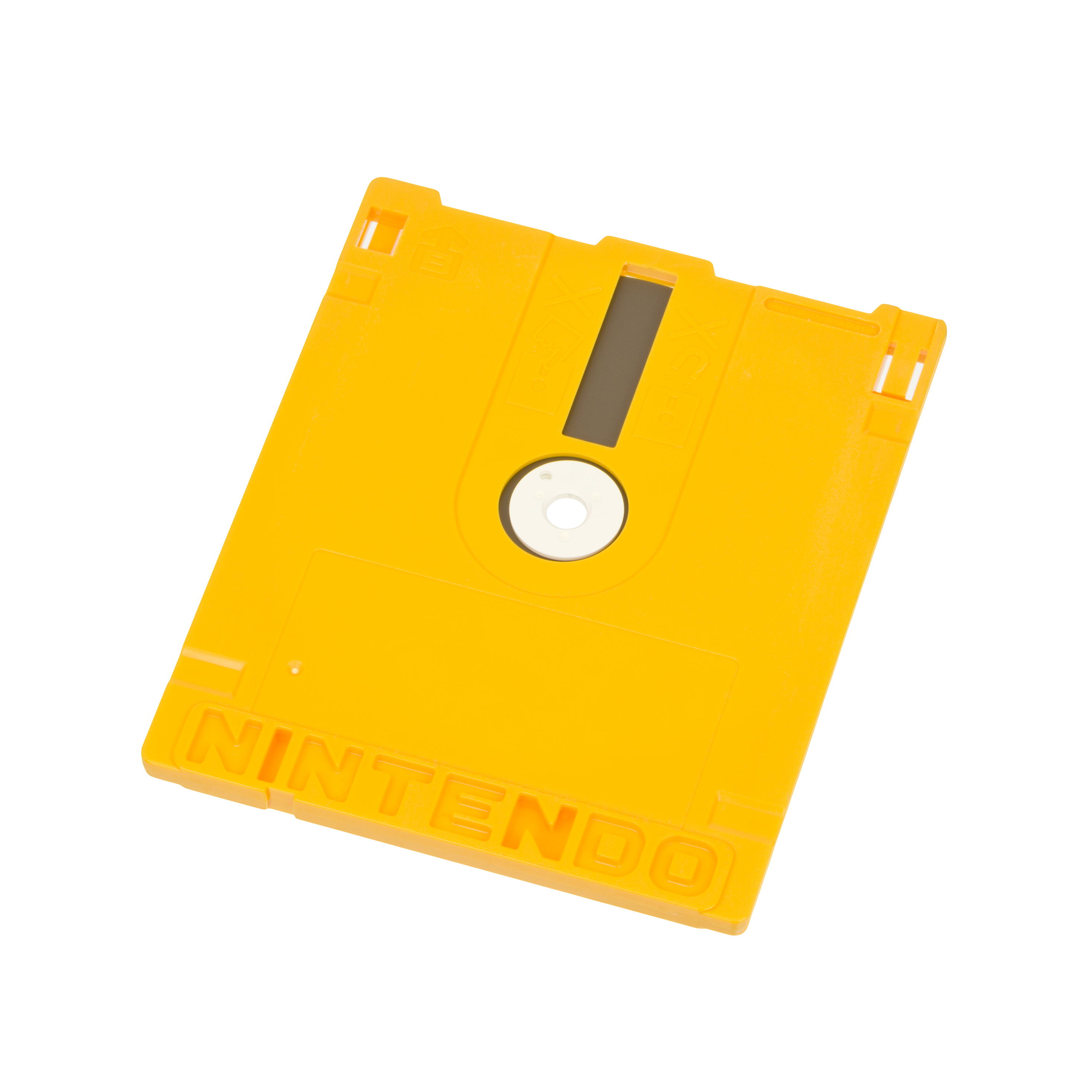
3-inch diskette of Nintendo Famicom Disk Systems

Mitsumi marketed several 3-inch diskette "Quick Disk" formats for OEM use. They used 2.8-inch magnetic discs. The OEM could decide on the outer case of the media which led to several mechanically incompatible solutions:

==== Famicom Disk System ====
The Japanese Nintendo Famicom Disk System used proprietary 3-inch diskettes called "Disk Cards" between 1986 and 1990, based on Mitsumi's Quick Disk media.

==== Smith Corona DataDisk ====
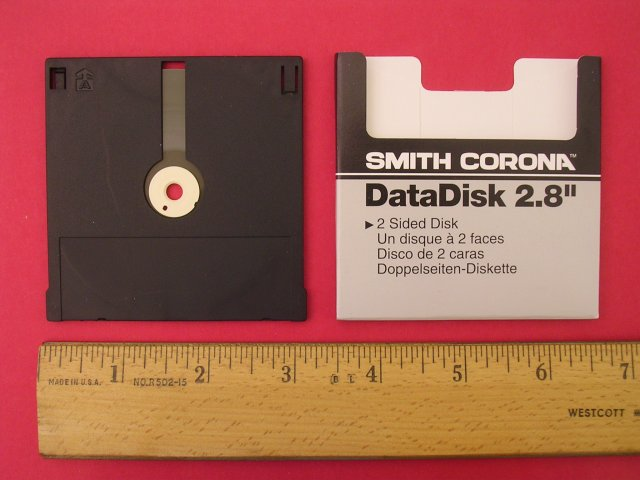
3-inch diskette from Smith Corona labelled 2.8-inch for the diameter of the magnetic disc itself

Many Smith Corona "CoronaPrint" word-processor typewriters used a proprietary double-sided 3-inch diskette format named "DataDisk". Confusingly, it was labelled 2.8-inch reflecting the diameter of the magnetic disk itself rather than the media's case.

=== Sharp 2.5-inch floppy disk ===
In 1986, Sharp introduced a 2.5-inch floppy disk format for use with their family of BASIC pocket computers. Two drives were produced: the Sharp CE-1600F and the CE-140F (chassis: FDU-250). Both took turnable diskettes named CE-1650F with a total capacity of 2×64 KB (128 KB) at 62464 bytes per side (512 byte sectors, 8 sectors/track, 16 tracks (00..15), 48 tpi, 250 kbit/s, 270 rpm with GCR (4/5) recording).

=== 2-inch floppy disks ===
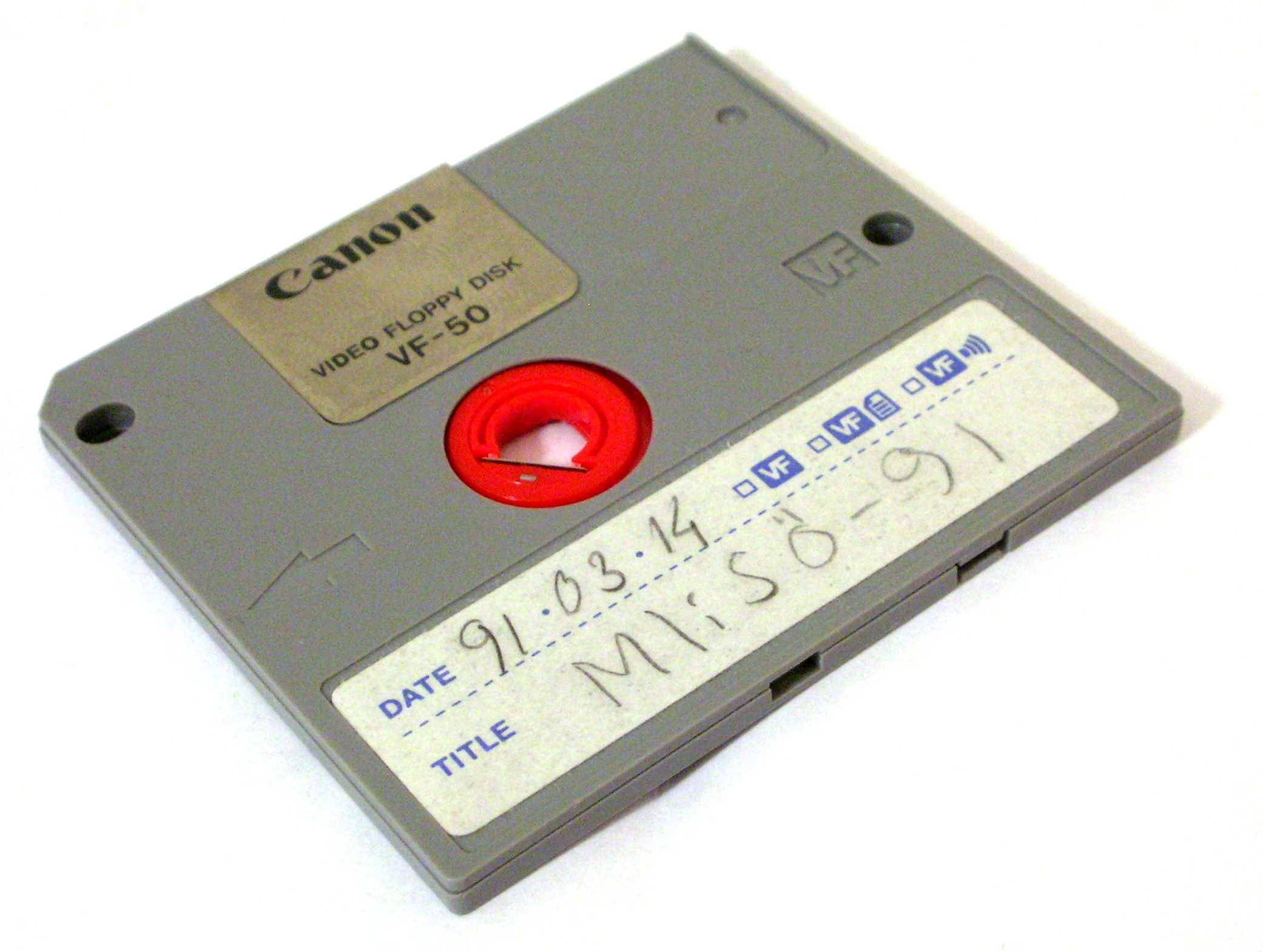
2-inch video floppy from Canon

At least two incompatible floppy disks measuring two inches appeared in the 1980s.

One of these, officially referred to as a Video Floppy (or VF for short) can be used to store video information for still video cameras such as the original Sony Mavica (not to be confused with later Digital Mavica models) and the Ion and Xapshot cameras from Canon. VF is not a digital data format; each track on the disk stores one video field in the analog interlaced composite video format in either the North American NTSC or European PAL standard. This yields a capacity of 25 images per disk in frame mode and 50 in field mode.

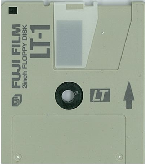
2-inch LT-1 floppy disk from Fuji

Another 2-inch format, the LT-1, is digitally formatted—720 kB, 245 TPI, 80 tracks/side, double-sided, double-density. They are used exclusively in the Zenith MinisPORT laptop computer circa 1989. Although the media exhibited nearly identical performance to the 3½-inch disks of the time, they were not very successful. This was due in part to the scarcity of other devices using this drive making it impractical for software transfer, and high media cost which was much more than 3½-inch and 5¼-inch disks of the time.

Much later, another 2-inch (case size: 54.5 mm × 50.2 mm × 2.0 mm) miniature disk format was Iomega's PocketZip (originally named Clik!), introduced in 1999. The disks could store 40 MB. The external drives were available as PC Card Type II and with USB interface.

== Extended use cases ==
=== Flippy disks ===
A flippy disk (sometimes known as a "flippy") is a double-sided 5 1/4-inch floppy disk, specially modified so that the two sides can be used independently (but not simultaneously) in single-sided drives. Many commercial publishers of computer software (mainly, relatively small programs like arcade games that could fit on a single-sided floppy disk) distributed their products on flippy disks formatted for two different brands of computer, e.g. TRS-80 on one side and Apple on the other. Compute! published an article on the topic in March 1981.

Generally, there are two levels of modifications:

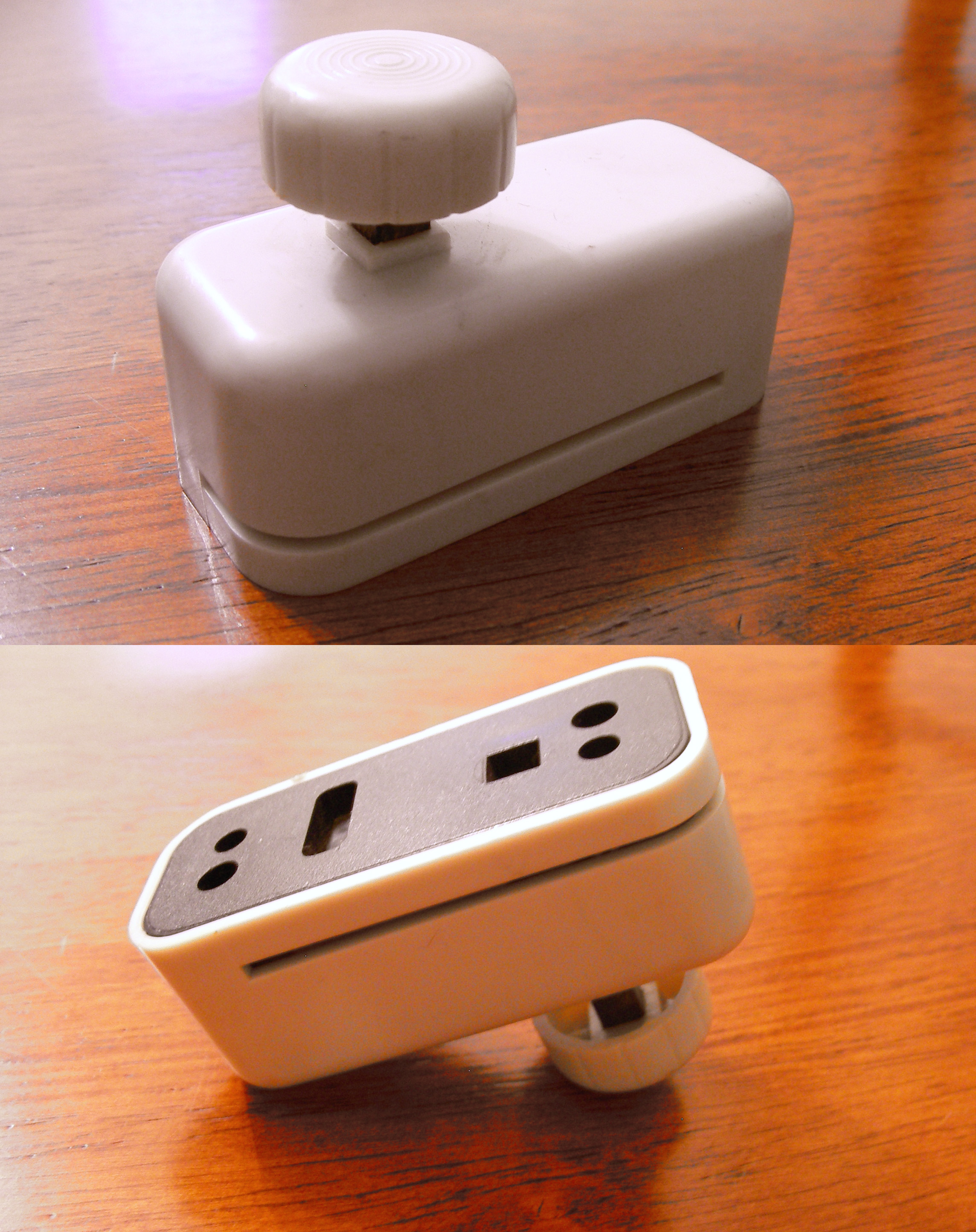
A write-notch puncher for 5 1/4-inch disks

- For Disk Operating Systems that do not use the index hole in the disk to mark the beginnings of tracks, the "flippy" modification required only a new write-enable notch to be cut if the disk was designed to be written to. For this purpose, specially designed single-rectangular-hole punchers, commonly known as disk doublers, were produced and sold by third-party computer accessory manufacturers. Many users, however, made do with a standard (round) hole puncher and/or an ordinary pair of scissors for this job.
  Commercial nonwriteable flippy disk with no write notches and two jacket index windows
- For disk operating systems that do use index sync, a second index hole window has to be punched in both sides of the jacket, and for hard-sectored formats, an additional window must be punched for the sector holes. While cutting a second notch is relatively safe, cutting an additional window into the jacket is a great peril to the disk itself.

A number of floppy-disk manufacturers produced ready-made "flippy" media. As the cost of media went down and double-sided drives became the standard, "flippies" became obsolete.

=== Auto-loaders ===
IBM developed, and several companies copied, an autoloader mechanism that can load a stack of floppies one at a time into a drive. These are very bulky systems, and suffer from media hangups and chew-ups more than standard drives, but they were a partial answer to replication and large removable storage needs. The smaller 5¼- and 3½-inch floppies made this a much easier technology to perfect.

=== Floppy mass storage ===
A number of companies, including IBM and Burroughs, experimented with using large numbers of unenclosed disks to create massive amounts of storage. The Burroughs system uses a stack of 256 12-inch disks, spinning at a high speed. The disk to be accessed is selected by using air jets to part the stack, and then a pair of heads flies over the surface as in some hard disk drives. This approach in some ways anticipated the Bernoulli disk technology implemented in the Iomega Bernoulli Box, but head crashes or air failures were spectacularly messy. The program did not reach production.

== Super floppy ==
Super floppy is one name for the fourth, "high-capacity" generation of floppy disks including for example Floptical, LS-120/LS-240, Sony HiFD and Caleb UHD144.

== Custom formatting types on 3½-inch and 5¼-inch media ==
=== Commodore 64/128 ===
Commodore started its tradition of special disk formats with the 5¼-inch disk drives accompanying its PET/CBM, VIC-20, and Commodore 64 home computers, the same as the 1540 and 1541 drives used with the later two machines. The standard Commodore Group Coded Recording (GCR) scheme used in 1541 and compatibles employed four different data rates depending upon track position (see zone bit recording). Tracks 1 to 17 had 21 sectors, 18 to 24 had 19, 25 to 30 had 18, and 31 to 35 had 17, for a disk capacity of 170.75 KB (175 decimal kB). Unique among personal computer architectures, the operating system on the computer itself is unaware of the details of the disk and filesystem; disk operations are handled by Commodore DOS instead, which was implemented with an extra MOS-6502 processor on the disk drive. Many programs such as GEOS bypass Commodore's DOS completely, and replace it with fast-loading (for the time) programs in the 1541 drive.

Eventually Commodore gave in to disk format standardization, and made its last 5¼-inch drives, the 1570 and 1571, compatible with Modified Frequency Modulation (MFM), to enable the Commodore 128 to work with CP/M disks from several vendors. Equipped with one of these drives, the C128 is able to access both C64 and CP/M disks, as it needs to, as well as MS-DOS disks (using third-party software), which was a crucial feature for some office work. At least one commercial program, Big Blue Reader by SOGWAP software was available to perform the task.

Commodore also developed a 3½-inch 800 KB disk format for its 8-bit machines with the 1581 disk drive, which uses only MFM.

The GEOS operating system uses a disk format that is largely identical to the Commodore DOS format with a few minor extensions; while generally compatible with standard Commodore disks, certain disk maintenance operations can corrupt the filesystem without proper supervision from the GEOS kernel.

=== Atari 8-bit computers ===
The combination of DOS and hardware (810, 1050 and XF551 disk drives) for Atari 8-bit floppy usage allows sectors numbered from 1 to 720 (1040 in the 1050 disk drive, 1440 in XF551). For instance, the DOS's 2.0 disk bitmap provides information on sector allocation, counts from 0 to 719. As a result, sector 720 cannot be written to by the DOS. Some companies used a copy-protection scheme where hidden data was put in sector 720 that cannot be copied through the DOS copy option. Another more-common early copy-protected scheme simply does not record important sectors as allocated in the VTOC, so the DOS Utility Package (DUP) does not duplicate them. All of these early techniques were thwarted by the first program that simply duplicated all sectors.

Later DOS versions (3.0 and later 2.5) and DOSes by third parties (i.e. OSS) accept (and format) disks with up to 1040 sectors, resulting in 130 KB of storage capacity per disk side on drives equipped with double-density controllers (i.e. not the Atari 810) vs. previous 90 KB. That unusual 130 KB format and was introduced by Atari with the 1050 drive with the introduction of DOS 3.0 in 1983.

A true double-density Atari floppy format (from 180 KB upwards) uses 128-byte sectors for sectors 1-3, then 256-byte sectors for the rest. The first three sectors typically contain boot code as used by the onboard ROM OS; it is up to the resulting boot program (such as SpartaDOS) to recognize the density of the formatted disk structure. While this format was developed by Atari for their DOS 2.0D and their (canceled) 180 KB Atari 815 floppy drive, that double-density DOS was never widely released and the format was generally used by third-party DOS products. Under the Atari DOS II scheme, sector 360 is the VTOC sector map, and sectors 361-367 contain the file listing. The Atari-brand DOS II versions and compatible use three bytes per sector for housekeeping and to link-list to the next sector.

Later, mostly third-party DOS systems added features such as double-sided drives, subdirectories, and drive types such as 720 KB, 1.2 MB, 1.44 MB. Well-known 3rd party Atari DOS products include SmartDOS (distributed with the Rana disk drive), TopDos, MyDos and SpartaDOS.

=== Amiga ===
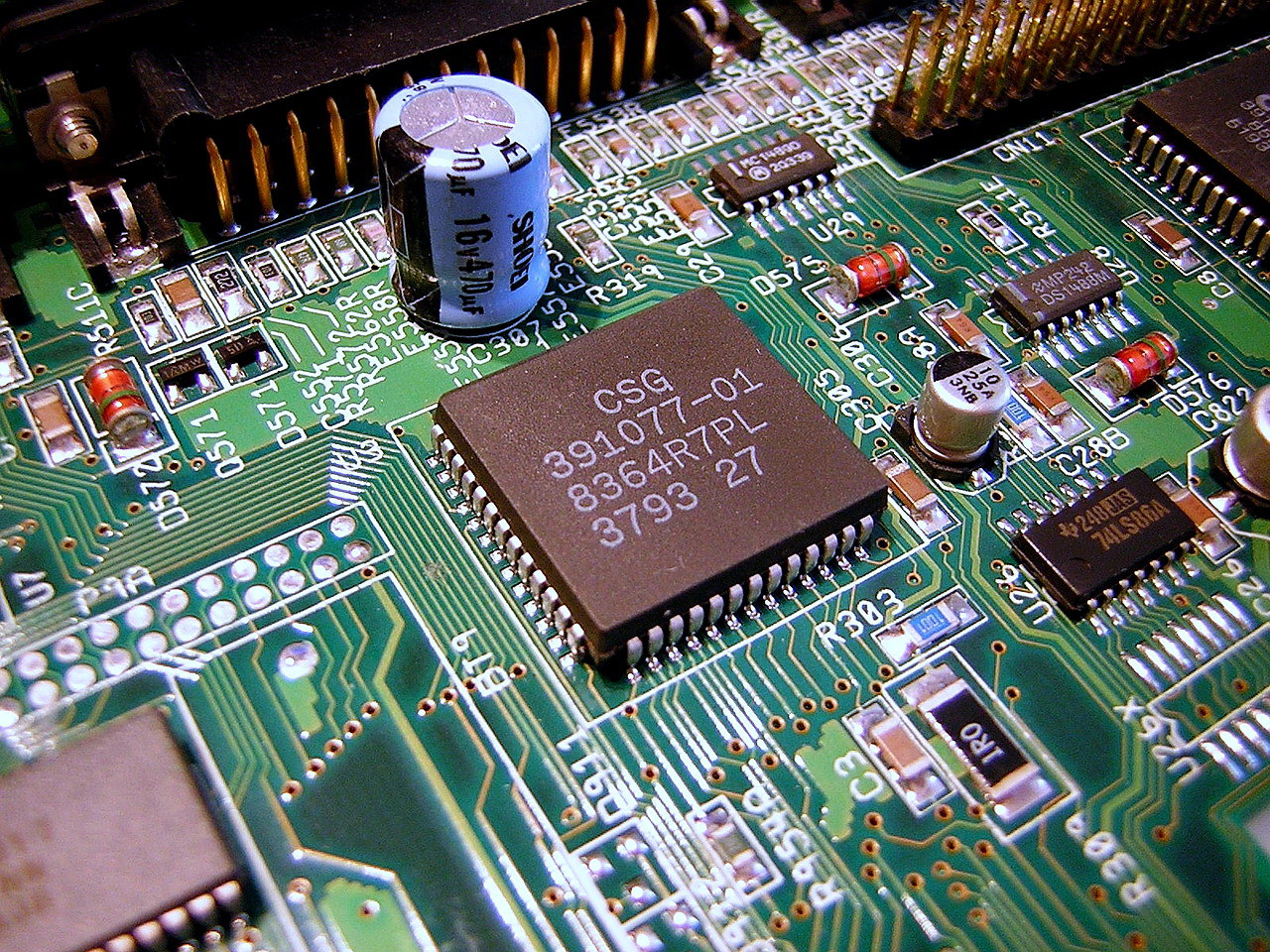
The pictured chip, codenamed Paula, controls floppy access on all revisions of the Commodore Amiga as one of its many functions.

An Amiga 2000 loading Lotus Turbo Challenge 2 which uses a custom disk format, resulting in some unusual sounds. The Amiga's empty drive clicking can also be heard at the beginning.

The Amiga computers use an 880 KB format (11×512-byte sectors per track, times 80 tracks, times two sides) on a 3½-inch floppy. Because the entire track is written at once, intersector gaps can be eliminated, saving space. The Amiga floppy controller is much more flexible than the one on the PC: it is free of arbitrary format restrictions, encoding such as MFM and GCR can be done in software, and developers were able to create their own proprietary disk formats. Because of this, foreign formats such as the IBM PC compatible's can be handled with ease (by use of CrossDOS, which was included with later versions of AmigaOS). With the correct filesystem driver, an Amiga can theoretically read any arbitrary format on the 3½-inch floppy, including those recorded at a slightly different rotation rate. On the PC, however, there is no way to read an Amiga disk without special hardware, such as an Individual Computers Catweasel, and a second floppy drive. Another alternative to read Amiga disk is open source and open hardware project Greaseweazle. It is simple STM32 based USB to FD interface adapter capable of reading magnetic flux image. With proper software, it is possible to read and write Amiga and almost any other floppy disk.

Commodore never upgraded the Original Chip Set to support high-density floppies, but sold a custom drive (made by Chinon) that spins at half speed (150 RPM) when a high-density floppy was inserted, enabling the existing floppy controller to be used. This drive was built into the Amiga 3000 and Amiga 4000, although the later Amiga 1200 was only fitted with the standard DD drive. The Amiga HD disks can handle 1760 KB, but using special software programs they can hold even more data. A company named Kolff Computer Supplies also made an external HD floppy drive (KCS Dual HD Drive) available which can handle HD format diskettes on all Amiga computer systems.

Because of storage reasons, the use of emulators and preserving data, many disks were packed into disk images. Currently popular formats are .ADF (Amiga Disk File), .DMS (DiskMasher) and .IPF (Interchangeable Preservation Format) files. The DiskMasher format is copy-protected and has problems storing particular sequences of bits due to bugs in the compression algorithm, but was widely used in the pirate and demo scenes. ADF has been around for almost as long as the Amiga itself though it was not initially called by that name. Only with the advent of the internet and Amiga emulators has it become a popular way of distributing disk images. The proprietary IPF files were created to allow preservation of commercial games which have copy protection, which is something that ADF and DMS cannot do.

=== Acorn Electron, BBC Micro, and Archimedes ===
The British company Acorn Computers used non-standard disk formats in their 8-bit BBC Micro and Acorn Electron, and their successor the 32-bit Acorn Archimedes. Acorn however, used standard disk controllers: initially FM, though they quickly transitioned to MFM. The original disk implementation for the BBC Micro stores 100 KB (40 track) or 200 KB (80 track) per side on 5¼-inch disks in a custom format using the Disc Filing System (DFS).

Due to the incompatibility between 40- and 80-track drives, much software was distributed on combined 40/80-track disks. These work by writing the same data in pairs of consecutive tracks in 80-track format, and including a small loader program on track 1 (which is in the same physical position in either format). The loader program detects which type of drive is in use, and loads the main software program straight from disk bypassing the DFS, double-stepping for 80-track drives and single-stepping for 40-track. This effectively achieves downgraded capacity to 100 KB from either disk format, but enabled distributed software to be effectively compatible with either drive.

For their Electron floppy-disk add-on, Acorn chose 3½-inch disks and developed the Advanced Disk Filing System (ADFS). It uses double-density recording and adds the ability to treat both sides of the disk as a single disk. This offers three formats:

- S (small): 160 KB, 40-track single-sided;
- M (medium): 320 KB, 80-track single-sided;
- L (large): 640 KB, 80-track double-sided.

ADFS provides hierarchical directory structure, rather than the flat model of DFS. ADFS also stores some metadata about each file, notably a load address, an execution address, owner and public privileges, and a lock bit. Even on the eight-bit machines, load addresses are stored in 32-bit format, since those machines support 16- and 32-bit coprocessors.

The ADFS format was later adopted into the BBC line upon release of the BBC Master. The BBC Master Compact marked the move to 3½-inch disks, using the same ADFS formats.

The Acorn Archimedes adds D format, which increases the number of objects per directory from 44 to 77 and increases the storage space to 800 KB. The extra space is obtained by using 1024 byte sectors instead of the usual 512 bytes, thus reducing the space needed for inter-sector gaps. As a further enhancement, successive tracks are offset by a sector, giving time for the head to advance to the next track without missing the first sector, thus increasing bulk throughput. The Archimedes uses special values in the ADFS load/execute address metadata to store a 12-bit filetype field and a 40-bit timestamp.

RISC OS 2 introduces E format, which retains the same physical layout as D format, but supports file fragmentation and auto-compaction. Post-1991 machines including the A5000 and Risc PC add support for high-density disks with F format, storing 1,600 KB. However, the PC combo IO chips used are unable to format disks with sector skew, losing some performance. ADFS and the PC controllers also support extra-high density (ED) disks as G format, storing 3,200 KB, but ED drives were never fitted to production machines.

With RISC OS 3, the Archimedes can also read and write disk formats from other machines (for example the Atari ST and the IBM PC, which are largely compatible depending on the ST's OS version). With third-party software it can even read the BBC Micro's original single-density 5¼-inch DFS disks. The Amiga's disks cannot be read by this system as they omitted the usual sector gap markers.

The Acorn filesystem design is interesting to some people because all ADFS-based storage devices connect to a module called FileCore which provides almost all the features required to implement an ADFS-compatible filesystem. Because of this modular design, it is easy in RISC OS 3 to add support for so-called image filing systems. These are used to implement completely transparent support for IBM PC format floppy disks, including the slightly different Atari ST format. Computer Concepts released a package that implements an image filing system to allow access to high density Macintosh format disks.

== See also ==
- dd (Unix)
- Disk image
- Disk storage
- Don't Copy That Floppy
- Floppy disk controller
- Floppy disk format
- Floppy disk hardware emulator
- Group coded recording
- History of the floppy disk
- List of floppy disk formats
- Sneakernet
- 3mode (1.2 MB format on 3.5-inch media)

== Bibliography ==
- Englisch, Lothar; Szczepanowski, Norbert (1984) [1983 German, Düsseldorf: Data Becker], The Anatomy of the 1541 Disk Drive, Grand Rapids, MI: Abacus Software, ISBN 0-916439-01-1.
- 9121D/S Disc Memory Operator's Manual, Hewlett Packard, 1982-09-01, Part No. 09121-90000.
- Immers, Richard; Neufeld, Gerald G. (1984). Inside Commodore DOS. The Complete Guide to the 1541 Disk Operating System. Data most & Reston (Prentice-Hall). ISBN 0-8359-3091-2.
- Weyhrich, Steven (2005), "The Disk II", Apple II History: a detailed essay describing one of the first commercial floppy disk drives.
