= List of MorphOS bundled applications =

This is a sub-article to MorphOS.

A number of bundled applications are delivered with the operating system.

== MorphOS bundled applications ==
Title	Purpose
Apdf	first PDF viewer
AudioRecorder	audio recorder software
Clock	desktop clock software
CSVViewer	CSV file viewer
Defrag	file system defragmentation software
Editor	text editor
Flacapella	CDDA ripper and encoder
Grabber	screenshot application
HDConfig	disk partitioning
Jalapeno	optical disc authoring
Jukebox	music player
KeyExplorer	keyboard mapping explorer
Kryptos	disk encryption suite
LCD Monitor Test	liquid crystal display (LCD) monitor testing tool
MIDI Piano	a virtual MIDI keyboard
MUIProCalc	scientific calculator
Multiview	media viewer
MysticView	image viewer
OWB	web browser
PFSDoctor	check and repair tool for Amiga Professional File System
RDesktop	Remote Desktop Client
RemoteShell	Secure Shell (SSH) client
SCANdal	image scanner software
Flow Studio	integrated development environment for developers
SFSDoctor	check and repair tool for Amiga Smart File System
ShowCase	image viewer
Sketch	raster graphics editor
Snoopium	system monitor
Transfer	FTP client
TaskManager	task manager
VPDF	PDF viewer
Zoom	screen magnifier
ZVNC Reloaded	VNC client
