= Disk Masher System =

The Disk Masher System (DMS) is an archival tool and associated file format used primarily on the Amiga computer. DMS creates a compressed image of an entire floppy disk. The disk is read block-by-block, and thus its data structure is maintained.

DMS won approval particularly in the demo scene and the warez scene, since it allowed floppy disks to be transferred easily with modems via bulletin board systems. However, its specificity to Amiga floppy disk geometry limited its use outside of that platform.

== Features ==
DMS is a command-line archiver tool for the Commodore Amiga platform. Unlike most archivers, which operate on a per-file basis, DMS reads an entire floppy disk as a single file. This allows the structure of the disk to be preserved, which aids in preserving the structure of the floppy disk precisely.

This is useful with disks that did not use the standard Amiga file system, such as commercial games, as well as disks using a non-standard boot block. However, many Amiga viruses operated using the bootblock; to combat this, DMS added a bootblock virus scanner. DMS aided in the accurate distribution of whole floppy disks over bulletin board systems.

DMS operates specifically on the Amiga floppy disk geometry (80 tracks, 2 sides, 11 sectors per track, 512 bytes per sector). It features the ability to copy only a subset of the 80 tracks, primarily useful to split a disk into two files. Uses of this include the distribution of small patches to commercial games (such as fixes to allow older games to run correctly on later Amiga models), copying disks on Amigas with limited RAM, and transferring DMS files via media which cannot store a full Amiga disk (such as 720 KB MS-DOS formatted floppy disks).

Multiple compression formats are supported. DMS files can also add a text notice to be displayed when the disk is unpacked, and a password can be supplied to encrypt the disk image.

== History ==
=== Background ===
DMS was a successor to Warp, a floppy disk archiving utility for the Commodore Amiga released by SDS Software in 1987. Warp V1.11 was distributed via dial-up BBS systems as a Zoo archive, and appeared on Fish Disk #243 in September 1989. This distribution also included an MS-DOS tool for dividing disk images to aid transfer between Amiga and MS-DOS systems. Warp disk images used the .WRP file extension. Warp 1.11 and the decompression tool Unwarp 1.01 were the last versions released. A hoax version Unwarp 1.40 was reportedly distributed which contained a virus.

=== The DISK-Masher ===
On 11 November 1990, following more than a year of development, SDS Software released V1.0 of The DISK-Masher (DMS for short), a new program intended to replace Warp. It used the .DMS file extension. DMS was able to pack and unpack standard Amiga 880KB DSDD floppy disks, or any other device with the same geometry.

DMS was distributed free of charge as a self-extracting archive, which would allow users to unpack the file without relying on another unpacking tool. Version 1.01 was distributed on Fish Disk #406 in November 1990. A shareware-like registration offered various enhanced versions and accessories, including an archiver for non-Amiga disk formats, a graphical user interface, an optimized version for the 68030 CPU, and a WRP to DMS convertor.

The final release of DMS, V1.11, was released on 1 July 1991. Features added earlier that year included checks for every known Amiga boot block virus, and new compression routines, the latter granting the designation "TURBO". The program gave itself the full title "The DISK-Masher: Command Line Version 1.11 TURBO GENERIC", with "TURBO" in bold and italics. It was uploaded to Aminet as a self-extracting archive on 15 August 1992.

=== Unauthorized versions ===
In 1993, due to a lack of bugfixes or updates from SDS Software, a series of unofficial releases of the software were made by Blackhack of Amiga demoscene group Paradox. On 15 November 1993, Disk-Masher System Version 1.51 was distributed on utility disk Tool-Box 18. New features included support for Amiga Fast File System formats used by AmigaDOS 2.x and 3.x, high density disk support, and bug fixes. Paradox announced plans to continue development of DMS, including soliciting shareware registrations.

Following the release of V1.53, which was variously also termed "The DMS-Masher", the developers formed ParCon Software, releasing a version 2 of the software, termed Device-Masher System. New features included a system for mounting a DMS file as virtual drive, the .FMS format to archive individual files, a self-extracting archive, and support for PC format disks via CrossDOS. Development continued as far as DMS V2.04.

== Reception and influence ==
=== Usage ===
DMS was widely used in the Amiga system. It was used by some Amiga magazines to distribute more data on each coverdisk, such as the November 1993 issue of Amiga Format, which was able to distribute Blitz BASIC on the same disk as several games. In the mid-1990s, public domain compilation CD-ROMs, collecting what had previously been distributed discrete floppy disks, also often used DMS format.

The Paradox/ParCon versions of DMS were widely accepted in the Amiga community, despite their unsanctioned nature. ParCon's DMS-Window V2.30 was distributed with Amiga Down Under's May 1994 issue, while DMSWorkbench was reviewed in Amiga Computing's November 1994 issue. They were distributed on various Amiga compilation CD-ROMs.

Various third-party tools were produced to handle DMS files, particularly graphical user interface front-ends like DMS Face, EasyDMS, HandyDMS, and DMS userinterface. Third-party support for DMS format includes XADMaster, which began adding support for the DMS format on 23 December 1998, the WinUAE Amiga emulator, and ADF-Workshop (formerly DMS-Workshop).

=== Decline in use ===
DMS suffered from various bugs, and would not always reliably reproduce disks; over 200 entries in the TOSEC index bear the "errdms" tag denoting this issue. The DiskMasher format is proprietary and copyright-protected, and has problems storing particular bit sequences due to bugs in the compression algorithm. By 1995, alternatives like xDM (eXtended Disk Masher) offered better compression and avoided legal issues associated with the unsanctioned versions of DMS.

In 1996, the Aminet banned the DMS format, due to the appearance of floppy disk viruses in uploaded disk images. Additional reasons included the inconvenience of handling floppy disks at a time when most Amiga users had hard drives, flaws in the DMS software, lack of support for the format on other platforms, and unsuitability for files larger than 880 KB.

The LHA archiver was already the de facto standard on the Amiga by this point, due to its superior speed, compression, versatility, and suitability for storing files larger or smaller than a whole floppy disk. For transferring whole disk images, the uncompressed Amiga Disk File (ADF) format used by the emulator UAE became the preferred standard.
