= Fast File System =

Fast File System may refer to:

- Berkeley Fast File System, as used by the various BSD variants
- Amiga Fast File System, as used by AmigaOS
