= Amiga Disk File =

File format used by Amiga computers

- Filename extensions: .adf, .adz, .hdf, .hdz
- Internet media type: application/x-amiga-disk-format
- Magic number: DOS
- Container for: disk data

Amiga Disk File (ADF) is a file format used by Amiga computers and emulators to store images of floppy disks, a single hard disk volumes (partitions) or complete, partitioned hard disks.

It has been around almost as long as the Amiga itself, although it was not initially called by any particular name. Before it was known as ADF, it was used in commercial game production, backup and disk virtualization. ADF is a track-by-track dump of the disk data as read by the Amiga operating system, and so the "format" is really fixed-width AmigaDOS data tracks appended one after another and held in a file. This file would, typically, be formatted, like the disk, in Amiga Old File System (OFS).

== ADF ==
Most ADF files are plain images of the Amiga-formatted tracks held on cylinder 0 to 79 of a standard 3.5-inch (89 mm) double-density floppy disk, also called an 880 KiB disk in Amiga terms. The size of an ADF will vary depending on how many tracks have been imaged, but in practice it is unusual to find ADF files that are not 901,120 bytes in size (80 cylinders × 2 heads × 11 sectors × 512 bytes/sector).

Most Amiga programs were distributed on double-density floppy disks. There are also 3.5-inch high-density floppy disks, which hold up to 1.76 MB of data, but these are uncommon. The Amiga also had 5.25-inch double-density disks.

== HDF ==
HDF files have the same binary format (sector-by-sector copy) as ADF files, but are used to store images of devices other than standard floppy disks. Most often, they are used to store just single volume with a filesystem (so they are basically like floppy disks with non-standard sizes), but HDFs can also contain a copy of a complete, partitioned hard disk (with Rigid Disk Block).

== ADZ and HDZ ==
ADZ and HDZ files are, respectively, an ADF and HDF files that have been compressed with gzip. The typical file extension is .adz or .hdz, derived from .adf.gz (or .hdf.gz).

== Software support ==
=== Amiga ===
ADF files can be downloaded and copied to Amiga disks with the EasyADF and various other applications freely available on the Internet.

=== Amiga emulators ===
The WinUAE Amiga emulator supports ADF files with all floppy disk formats (3.5" DD and HD, 5.25" DD), as well as single and multiple volume HDF files.

=== Unix and Unix-like systems ===
As ADF files are plain disk images, they can be handled by the Unix tool dd. On Linux and NetBSD, which support the most common Amiga filesystems, ADF files can be mounted directly, either using native system driver or user space fuseadf.

=== Microsoft Windows ===
There is a program called ADF Opus, which is a Microsoft Windows–based program that allows people to create their own ADF files. This program supports creating double density (880 KB ADF files, the most common) and high-density (1.76 MB) ADF files. ADF Opus also allows people to convert ADF files into ADZ files.

=== MacOS ===
For MacOs, there are 2 applications dedicated for work with ADF files: ADF.inder with a graphical user interface and a command-line send2adf.

=== Multiplatform ===
A free GPL-licensed software library ADFlib allows to programmatically create and use disk images in ADF format, providing block-level access and support for Amiga filesystems OFS and FFS. It also includes several command-line utilities, one of them is unADF, which allows to extract data from ADF files. The library is used by many applications, including mentioned earlier: ADF Opus, ADF.inder, send2adf and fuseadf and also others like ADF Explorer for R.

The part of utility pack amitools contains a set of programs named xdftool. It is under GPL and can read, write, format, and do other operations with ADF images. xdftool is also able to create high-density ADF files with the currently undocumented create parameter type=adf_hd.

== Related formats ==
=== IPF ===
The ADF file format can only store disks that have legal AmigaDOS format tracks. Disks with non-standard tracks may be available in ADF format, albeit cracked in order to create a regular AmigaDOS volume. However, the Amiga itself was not limited to storing data in these standard tracks. The Amiga's floppy disk controller was very basic but transparent, and for that reason very flexible allowing disks of other and custom formats to be read and written as well. Disk handling is not locked down like the one in a modern PC, and so most of the work to read and write disks is done by the operating system itself. However, because programmers did not have to use the operating system routines, it was quite normal for games developers to create their own disk formats and also apply many different sorts of copy protection. As it was, most full-price commercial Amiga games had some form of custom disk format and/or copy protection on them. For this reason, most commercial Amiga games cannot be stored in ADF files unaltered, but there is an alternative called Interchangeable Preservation Format (IPF) which was specifically designed for this purpose.

The Software Preservation Society Interchangeable Preservation Format (.IPF) is an open format for which the source code of the official library is available.

=== DMS ===
ADF files were sometimes compressed using the Disk Masher System, resulting in .dms files.

=== FDI ===
FDI (from Formatted Disk Image) is a universal disk image file format specification originally published by Vincent Joguin in 2000. The FDI format is publicly documented, and accompanied by open source access tools. Because the format can store raw low-level data, as is for example required to support copy protection schemes and other non-standard formats, FDI files can be larger than disk image files in other formats. The typical file extension is .fdi. Because of the universal design of the FDI format, files in other disk image formats, such as ADF, ADZ and DMS, can in theory be converted to FDI.
