= AIPTEK =

AIPTEK, Inc. (Affordable Innovative Personal Technologies) was a manufacturer of consumer electronic products that mainly produced pico projectors, camcorders, graphic tablets and digitizers, as well as photo frames and 3D products. The company was founded in 1997 in Hsinchu, Taiwan. Since January 14, 2003, Aiptek was listed on the Taiwan Stock Exchange under the ticker symbol 6225.

Aiptek had offices in Shanghai (China), Irvine (California) and Willich (North Rhine-Westphalia).

It has 51 employees.

== History ==
Aiptek Inc. was founded in 1997, starting the development and production of graphics tablets to create drawings on computers, and expanding to include products such as the Hyperpen. The brand became internationally recognized in 2000, with the roll-out of the PenCam, which sold more than 2.5 million units in a short period. In 2006, the company launched the world's first digital frame with an embedded camera to digitize analog photos. In 2010, Aiptek developed the Pocket Cinema V10, one of the first mobile projectors available in the worldwide market, followed by a series of other models. Along with devices for laptops, iPads, iPhones and iPods, Aiptek also launched "comical" designs such as the Ghetto Blaster and Karaoke function.
