= CrossDOS =

File system handler for accessing FAT formatted media on Amiga computers

- Developer: Consultron
- Release: October 1, 1989; 36 years ago
- Final release: 7
- Operating system: AmigaOS
- Platform: Amiga
- Type: Filesystem handler
- License: Proprietary software

CrossDOS is a file system handler for accessing FAT formatted media on Amiga computers. It was bundled with AmigaOS 2.1 and later. Its function was to allow working with disks formatted for PCs and Atari STs (and others). In the 1990s it became a commonly used method of file exchange between Amiga systems and other platforms.

CrossDOS supported both double density (720 KB) and high density (1.44 MB) floppy disks on compatible disk drives. As with AmigaDOS disk handling, it allowed automatic disk-change detection for FAT formatted floppy disks. The file system was also used with hard disks and other media for which CrossDOS provided hard disk configuration software. However, the versions of CrossDOS bundled with AmigaOS did not support long filenames, an extension to FAT that was introduced with Microsoft's Windows 95.

== History ==
CrossDOS was originally developed in 1989 as a stand-alone commercial product by Leonard Poma of Consultron, which was available for AmigaOS 1.2 and 1.3. In 1992 Commodore included a version of CrossDOS with AmigaOS 2.1 (and with later versions), so that users could work with PC formatted disks. The bundled CrossDOS replaced an obscure tool in earlier versions of AmigaOS that could access FAT-formatted disks on a secondary floppy disk drive only; this tool was not a complete file system but a user program to read files from a FAT formatted disk. Development of CrossDOS continued not only long after being bundled with the OS, but also long after the Amiga itself was continued, owing to its widespread use among more moneyed high-end users. CrossDOS 7, released in 1998, was the last version released and included support for long filenames and other features not available in the bundled version.

== See also ==
- Amiga Fast File System
- Amiga Old File System
- File Allocation Table
- List of file systems
- Comparison of file systems

== Works cited ==
- Garnett, Walt (1995). Garbage In, Gorgeous Out: Text and Graphics Translation. Windcrest/McGraw-Hill. p. 5–6 27, 37–38, 365–367. ISBN 0079118941 – via the Internet Archive.
