= TOSEC =

Retrocomputing project

- Stable release: 2024-05-17
- Operating system: Cross-platform
- Website: www.tosecdev.org

The Old School Emulation Center (TOSEC) is a retrocomputing initiative founded in February 2000 initially for the renaming and cataloging of software files intended for use in emulators, that later extended their work to the cataloging and preservation of also applications, firmware, device drivers, games, operating systems, magazines and magazine cover disks, comic books, product box art, videos of advertisements and training, related TV series and more. The catalogs provide an overview and cryptographic identification of media that allows for automatic integrity checking and renaming of files, checking for the completeness of software collections and more, using management utilities like ClrMamePro or ROMVault.

As the project grew in popularity it started to become a de facto standard for the management of retrocomputing and emulation resources. In 2013 many TOSEC catalogued files started to be included in the Internet Archive after the work quality and attention to detail put into the catalogs was praised by some of their archivists.

TOSEC usually makes two releases per year. As of release 2023-01-23, TOSEC catalogs span ~195 unique brands and hundreds of unique computing platforms and continues to grow. As of this time the project had identified and cataloged more than 1.2 million different software images and sets (more than half of that for Commodore systems), describing a source set of about 8TB of software and resources.

== See also ==
- Digital preservation
- MobyGames - Video game cataloging project
