= Amiga rigid disk block =

Computer disk partitioning standard for Amiga computers

In computing, a rigid disk block (RDB) is the block on a hard disk where the Amiga series of computers store the disk's partition and filesystem information. The IBM's PC equivalent of the Amiga's RDB is the master boot record (MBR).

Unlike its PC equivalent, the RDB doesn't directly contain metadata for each partition. Instead it points to a linked list of partition blocks, which contain the actual partition data. The partition data includes the start, length, filesystem, boot priority, buffer memory type and "flavor", though the latter was never used. Because there is no limitation in partition block count, there is no need to distinguish primary and extended types and all partitions are equal in stature and architecture.

Additionally, it may point to additional filesystem drivers, allowing the Amiga to boot from filesystems not directly supported by the ROM, such as PFS or SFS.

The data in the rigid disk block must start with the ASCII bytes "RDSK". Furthermore, its position is not restricted to the very first block of a volume, instead it could be located anywhere within its first 16 blocks. Thus it could safely coexist with a master boot record, which is forced to be found at block 0.

Nearly all Amiga hard disk controllers support the RDB standard, enabling the user to exchange disks between controllers.

== See also ==
- Master Boot Record (MBR)
- Extended Boot Record (EBR)
- GUID Partition Table (GPT)
- Boot Engineering Extension Record (BEER)
- Apple Partition Map (APM)
- BSD disklabel
