= Amiga Old File System =

File system for AmigaOS

On the Amiga, the Old File System, sometimes also called Amiga File System, was the filesystem for AmigaOS before the Amiga Fast File System. Even though it used 512-byte blocks, it reserved the first small portion of each block for metadata, leaving an actual data block capacity of 488 bytes per block. It wasn't very suitable for anything except floppy disks, and it was soon replaced.

== History ==
Commonly known as just the Amiga File System, it originally came from the filesystem of TRIPOS, which formed the basis of the first versions of AmigaDOS. It received the nickname of "Old" or "Original" File System when Fast File System was released with AmigaOS 1.3.

OFS is very good for repairing the filesystem in the event of a problem, although the so-called DiskDoctor provided by Commodore quickly earned the name DiskDestroyer, because it could not repair No-DOS type autostart disks provided by third-party software manufacturers as bootable disks for games. The idea to create non-standard autobootable disks was born in a primitive attempt to prevent copy of such disks and to avoid the loading and launch of Amiga DOS, in order to directly access the Amiga graphic, audio and memory chipsets. DiskDoctor in fact changed autostart disks bootblocks into standard AmigaDOS-based ones, renaming a disk with "Lazarus" namedisk, and made the autostart disk unusable.

== Characteristics of AmigaDOS Floppy Disks ==
Amiga uses MFM encoding/decoding by default when handling floppy disks. There are 80 cylinders on an Amiga floppy disk. Each cylinder has 2 MFM tracks, one on each side of the disk. Double density (DD) disks have 11 sectors per MFM track, high density (HD) disks have 22 sectors.

The geometry of an Amiga floppy disk is as follows:

- DD disks: 512 bytes/sector, 11 sector/track, 2 track/cyl, 80 cyl/disk
- HD disks: 512 bytes/sector, 22 sector/track, 2 track/cyl, 80 cyl/disk

The DD disk has 11 * 2 * 80 = 1760 (0 to 1759) blocks, while the HD disk has 22 * 2 * 80 = 3520 blocks.

Amiga stores 880 KiB on a DD disk and 1760 KiB on an HD floppy disk.

== Characteristics of Files under AmigaDOS ==
Prior to AmigaOS 3.5, AmigaDOS file handles maintained a 32-bit wide offset parameter (unsigned), telling where to start the next read or write operation. The biggest size for any single Amiga file under these operating systems therefore comes to 2^{32} = 4 GiB. After Amiga OS 3.5, file handles may reference 2^{64} = 16 EiB files. However, OFS-formatted disks continue to retain the 32-bit limitations, for that is an intrinsic limitation of the format as recorded on the media.

An OFS datablock stores block size BSIZE-24 bytes (i.e. normally 488 bytes at most frequently used BSIZE of 512 bytes).

The rootblock is located at the physical middle of the media: block number 880 for DD disks, block 1760 for HDs. This helps minimize seek times.

The exact calculation for where it is stored is as follows:

numCyls = highCyl - lowCyl + 1

highKey = numCyls * numSurfaces * numBlocksPerTrack - 1

rootKey = INT (numReserved + highKey) / 2

The rootblock contains information about the disk: its name, its formatting date, etc. It also contains information on accessing the files/directories/links located at the uppermost (root) directory.

The characters '/' and ':' are forbidden in file and volume names, but *!@#$%|^+&_()=\-[]{}';",<>.? and letters with diacritical marks like âè are allowed.

The date fields in the root block (and other blocks) are structured in the form of DAYS, MINS and TICKS. The DAYS field contains the number of days since January 1. 1978. MINS is the number of minutes that have passed since midnight and TICKS are expressed in 1/50s of a second. A day value of zero is considered illegal by most programs. Since the DAYS value is stored as a 32-bit number, the Amiga filesystem does not have an inherent Year 2000 problem or Year 2038 problem.

To reach a file, directory or link, AmigaDOS uses a hash function to calculate which 32-bit word in the disk block to use as a pointer to a hash bucket list, which in turn contains the file, directory, or link record. A bucket list is used to support filesystem objects with names that hash to the same offset. For example: file_1a, file_24 and file_5u have the same hash value.

Filename characters can be lowercase and uppercase, but are not case sensitive when accessed. That is to say, "MyFile" and "myfile" in the same directory refer to the same file.

Files are composed of a file header block, which contains information about the file (size, last access time, data block pointers, etc.), and the data blocks, which contain the actual data. The file header block contains up to BSIZE/4-56 data block pointers (which amounts to 72 entries with the usual 512 byte blocks). If a file is larger than that, file extension blocks will be allocated to hold the data block pointers. File extension blocks are organised in a linked list, which starts in the file header block ('extension' field).

== See also ==
- Amiga Fast File System
- Professional File System
- Smart File System
- List of file systems
- Rigid Disk Block
