= Smart File System =

Journaling filesystem used on Amiga computers

SFS
- Developer: John Hendrikx
- Full name: Smart File System
- Introduced: 1998; 28 years ago
- Partition IDs: 'SFS\0'

Limits
- Max volume size: 127 GB
- Max file size: 4 GB
- Max filename length: 107 characters

Features
- Date range: January 1, 1978 - 2157
- Date resolution: 1/50s
- Attributes: filenote, hidden, undeletable
- Transparent compression: No
- Transparent encryption: No (provided at the block device level)

Other
- Supported operating systems: AmigaOS (version 1.279), AROS (1.84), MorphOS (1.224), AmigaOS 4 (1.293), Linux (1.0beta12), Haiku (via add-on)

The Smart File System (SFS) is a journaling filesystem used on Amiga computers and AmigaOS-derived operating systems (though some support also exists for IBM PC compatibles). It is designed for performance, scalability and integrity, offering improvements over standard Amiga filesystems as well as some special or unique features.

== Features ==
SFS uses block sizes ranging from 512 (2^{9}) to 32768 (2^{15}) bytes with a maximum partition size of 128 GB. Its good performance, better than FFS, and lack of need for long "validation" in case of an error, is achieved by grouping multiple directory entries into a single block and by grouping meta data blocks together into clusters. A bitmap is used to keep track of free space, and file data is kept track of using extents arranged into a B+ tree structure.

Integrity is maintained by keeping a transaction log of all changes made to metadata over a certain period of time. The log is written to disk first into free space and then meta data blocks are overwritten directly. Should the system crash, the next time the filesystem is mounted it will notice the uncompleted operation and roll it back to the last known consistent state. For performance reasons, only metadata integrity is ensured. Actual data in files can still be corrupted if a write operation is terminated halfway through. Unlike the original Amiga filesystems, FFS and OFS, filesystem integrity is very rarely compromised by this.

One feature of SFS that is almost unique among Amiga filesystems is its ability to defragment itself while the filesystem is in use, even for locked files. The defragmentation process is almost completely stateless (apart from the location it is working on), which means it can be stopped and started instantly. During defragmentation data integrity is ensured of both meta data and normal data. The filesystem may attempt to move a whole file to a different location when fragmentation is going to occur otherwise.

The filesystem offers a directory containing deleted files for recovery.

== History ==
SFS is written in C and was originally created and released as freeware in 1998 by John Hendrikx. After the original author left the Amiga scene in 2000, the source code to SFS was released and its development continued by Ralph Schmidt in MorphOS.

Since May 2005 SFSobjec and SFSconfig are available under the GPL license. SFS development has now forked; as well as the original Amiga version, there are now versions for MorphOS, AROS, AmigaOS 3, and a version for AmigaOS 4, which have different feature sets but remain compatible to each other. In addition, there is a driver for Linux to read (experimental to write) Amiga SFS volumes, GRUB natively supports it, and there are free drivers to use it from UEFI.

As of 2008, SFS was one of the independent filesystems still being used on Amiga computers.

Versions for AROS, AmigaOS and MorphOS are based on different branches. The Linux version is independent code.

== See also ==
- Amiga Old File System
- Amiga Fast File System
- Professional File System
- Amiga rigid disk block
- List of file systems
