= Amiga software =

Amiga software is computer software engineered to run on the Amiga personal computer. Amiga software covers many applications, including productivity, digital art, games, commercial, freeware and hobbyist products. The market was active in the late 1980s and early 1990s but then dwindled. Most Amiga products were originally created directly for the Amiga computer (most taking advantage of the platform's unique attributes and capabilities), and were not ported from other platforms.

During its lifetime, thousands of applications were produced with over 10,000 utilities^{[1]} (collected into the Aminet repository). However, it was perceived as a games machine from outside its community of experienced and professional users. More than 12,000 games were available.^{[2]}^{[ 3]}^{[ 4]} New applications for the three existing Amiga-like operating systems^{[5]} are generally ported from the open source (mainly from Linux) software base.

Many Amiga software products or noteworthy programs during the timeline were ported to other platforms or inspired new programs, such as those aimed at 3D rendering or audio creations, e.g. LightWave 3D, Cinema 4D, and Blender (whose development started for the Amiga platform only). The first multimedia word processors for Amiga, such as TextCraft, Scribble!, Rashumon, and Wordworth, were the first on the market to implement full color WYSIWYG (with other platforms then only implementing black-and-white previews) and allowing the embedding of audio files.

== History and characteristics ==
=== From the origins to 1988 ===
==== 1985 ====
Amiga software started its history with the 1985 Amiga 1000. Commodore International released the programming specifications and development computers to various software houses, prominently Electronic Arts, a software house that then offered Deluxe Paint, Deluxe Music and others. Electronic Arts also developed the Interchange File Format (IFF) file container, to store project files realized by Deluxe Paint and Deluxe Music. IFF became the de facto standard in AmigaOS. The first to be shown were digitizer software ProPaint (in early beta). Both were used by Andy Warhol to produce a black-and-white photo of Debbie Harry at the Launch Gala at Lincoln Center, New York City in July 1985^{[6]}. In 1985 Commodore licensed the software called Transformer from Simile Research and put it on the market in January 1986, bundled with an external A1020 5.25-inch floppy drive. It emulated 8086 Intel-based PC-XT hardware. It could run MS-DOS and MS-DOS software such as Lotus 123 or WordStar. This provided early access to many applications, while waiting for native Amiga software to be developed^{[7]}. In 1985, Deluxe Paint emerged with graphic features that had been available only on dedicated graphic computers. It was dubbed the first Amiga "Killer application".

==== 1986 ====
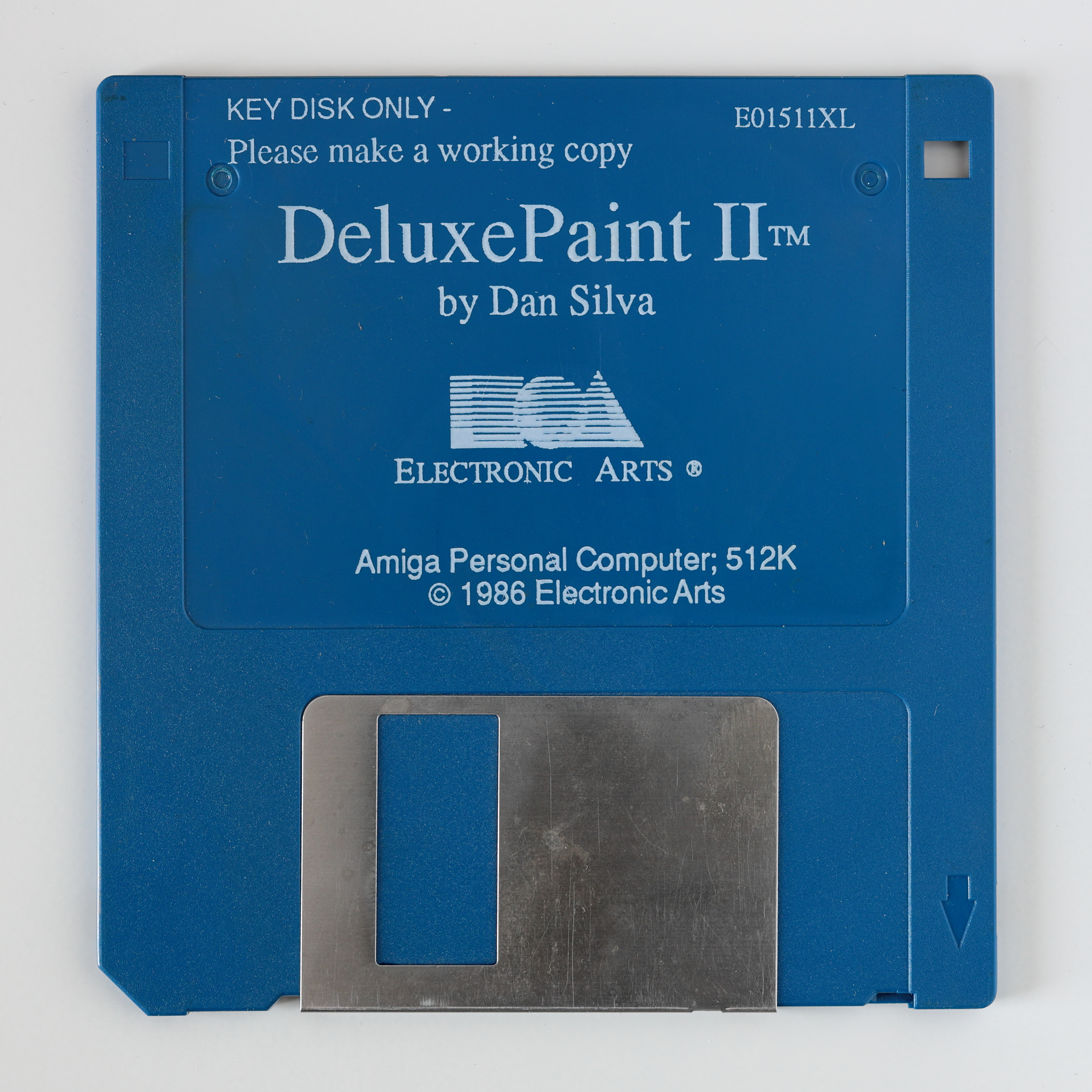
Deluxe Paint II on floppy disk

In 1986, Amiga software products contributed to the Amiga's success as a game and multimedia machine. AmigaBasic from Microsoft, VizaWrite, TextCraft (word processors), Pagesetter (Desktop Publishing), Analyze! (Spreadsheet), Superbase Personal (Database), MovieCraft (animation), Deluxe Paint II, Deluxe Music, Instant Music (a composition music program for non musicians) from Electronic Arts, and GraphiCraft again from Commodore were released. GraphiCraft was used by computer artist Jim Sachs to produce Amiga software such as Defender of the Crown and Centurion: Defender of Rome from Cinemaware and the Amiga porting of Saucer Attack. Graphicraft was a predecessor of Aegis Images and AEGIS Animator,^{[8]}^{[9]} one of the first programs worldwide capable of creating animation videos and cartoons complete with audio stereo, featuring a cel animation working paradigm interface and outputting files based on delta-frame difference compression method which then were the lead for creating the ANIM file type standard. Byte-by-Byte Software Inc. released Sculpt-3D. It was the first rendering tool available for the first time to a vast audience of public, and in October of the same year, Impulse released TurboSilver.

==== 1987 ====
In 1987, the Amiga 500 (A500) was released. The Amiga software market moved in favor of entertainment over professional software.

ProWrite (word processor), Maxiplan 500 (spreadsheet), and Aegis Sonix, a music program similar to Instant Music, were produced. ^{[10]}.

In July, Wordperfect created an "Amiga/Atari Division" and started selling a version of its word processor for the Commodore platform for US$400^{[11]}. It could load and save Wordperfect files created on any platform, such as IBM, Macintosh and Apple II.^{[12]} Wordperfect 4.1 for the Amiga was the first word processor in the world capable of opening an unlimited number of documents (limited by RAM), each in a separate window.^{[13]}

In 1987, Andrew Tanenbaum released Minix, a free version of Unix with complete source code.

At COMDEX NewTek showed for the first time a prototype of Video Toaster and Impulse released TurboSilver 2.0.

==== 1988 ====
In 1988, Photon Paint was released. It allowed digital painting using HAM graphics mode and the full 4096-color palette of Amiga on a single screen. Maxiplan 500 become Maxiplan 1.x, Electronic Arts showed DeLuxe Photo Lab (photo editing software), Newtek demonstrated DigiView 3.0 hardware and software image digitizing suite, and WordPerfect released the WordPerfect Library for the Amiga. At the summer Consumer Electronics Show (CES), the Pro Draw graphic tablet with mouse emulation software was also announced, as well as Flash-Back and Quarterback hard drive backup software. Superbase Personal became Superbase Professional, Micro Illusions started shipping Music-X audio software for the Amiga, and Lattice released its C++ preprocessor for the Amiga. Cygnus Editor ubiquitous text editor, one of the most versatile text editors and best seller on Amiga since then, was also released this year. It was one of the first Amiga programs featuring an AREXX port. Gold Disk released ComicSetter (comic creation) and MovieSetter (32-color cartoons with stereo sound animation software). In November, at the World of Commodore Show, ReadySoft demonstrated its Amax Macintosh emulator for the Amiga.

GfxBase released the X Windows System for the Amiga. Running under AmigaDos it used a custom screen to allow users access to X Window programs on other Amigas as well as non-Amiga systems on the local network. Also the 3 button Boing! optical mouse was available for Amiga users.

=== 1989–1994 ===
A short animation rendered with LightWave 3.5

In 1989, Rashumon was first launched. In 1990, AmigaDOS 2.0 was released. The interface of the Workbench GUI was changed to a fake 3D aspect using gray shades. For the first time, Commodore introduced a style guide for developers on AmigaOS; because of this, the majority of Amiga software developed for AmigaDOS 2.0 had a standardized GUI that improved usability. Programs such as Imagine 3D, Lightwave, ImageFX, and Scala continued using non-standard GUIs. AmigaVision was released and bundled free with any model of Amiga 3000. Directory Master, Directory Opus, TurboCalc, Photogenics, ImageFX, PC Task, Photogenics, Caligari, Final Calc, and Cinema 4D all belong to this period.

=== 1994 to today ===
After 1994, Commodore's demise left Amiga to an uncertain future. Windows-based PCs became the standard in the home and the office. Many software houses either left the Amiga market or ran into financial troubles. In 1996, Aminet was created. Aminet was the first centralized Internet repository of all Amiga public domain software and documents. It was the first Internet experiment of a centralized software repository created and maintained by one community for the community itself. Amiga's browsers like AWeb, IBrowse and Voyager were enhanced. Voyager was the first browser to adopt tabbed browsing. Mailers like YAM are still used. In productivity software, programs like Candy Factory for image processing were still being developed, for VFX and animation programs like Wildfire by Andreas Maschke (ported by the author to Java later). other prominent graphic software include fxPAINT by IOSpirit, fxSCAN for OCR and scanning by IOSpirit, and SketchBlock painting program by Andy Broad for AmigaOS 4.x. Last but not least Tornado3D raytracing program by the Italian company Eyelight.

=== Usability ===
Amiga software presents a complete graphical interface, following Amiga WYSIWYG "desktop paradigm" and native AmigaOS interface guidelines; that is to say, the software is mouse-driven and presents also pull-down "menus" and "dialogue windows". AmigaOS maintained a text-based shell allowing software to present a text-based GUI, or a "command line".

== Cataloging ==
The main software categories are

- Productivity software (also called application software);
- Support and maintenance utilities for formatting hard disks, recover or backup data, etc.;
- Multimedia software (graphic, video, music);
- Communication software (including the software for dealing with Internet and any other net);
- Programming tools for developing products and applications;
- other utilities that enhance the ease of use in any Operating System (for example Application Launching Docks); Accessibility; Games; Emulation software that allows a computer to run software written for another architecture.

=== Productivity software ===
Amiga created productivity software which covers graphics, video, design and CAD software; graphic utilities; vector graphics programs and converters; word processors; programmable text editors; database and spreadsheets; science, entertainment and special use programs: entertainment; fractals, virtual reality, artificial intelligence; route planning; personal Organizer, notebook, diary software; personal budgeting, home banking and accounting.

=== Support and maintenance utilities ===
Amiga created utilities for hard disk partitioning; diagnostic tools; VGA promoting tools for ancient Amiga software with TV resolution graphic screens; game loaders for storing and auto-loading from hard disks, auto-starting non-standard floppy disks; disk copiers; backup and recovery tools, archive and compression utilities; command line interfaces and text-based shells; graphical GUI interfaces with WIMP paradigm; advanced graphics systems; PostScript; fonts; font design; audio system; native, external, widely common used, and third-party filesystems; MultiView; MIME types; USB stacks; Firewire stacks (IEEE 1394); printer drivers; video digitizers; graphic tablets; scanner drivers; genlocks, chroma-key, signal video inverters; infrared devices and remote controls; WiFi and Bluetooth devices; and special devices.

=== Music ===
Music software includes sound design; audio synthesis; music; audio digitizing and sampling; hard disk recording; speech synthesis; audio trackers; MOD music module filetype.

=== Communications software ===
Solutions include modem software, Direct Connect, BBS managing, Fidonet, Packet Radio; Prestel, Videotel, Videotex, Minitel; Teletext, Televideo, Viewdata; FAX, answering machine and voice mail; ISDN; networking and Ethernet protocols; World Wide Web (TCP/IP stacks, browsers, E-mail programs, newsreaders, Internet Radio, proxy server support programs, PPP, Telnet, podcasting, RSS feed, Distributed Net, Google Services, Instant Messaging and chat, FTP and FTP server, weather casting news, Webcam supporting, clock synchronization, SMS Short Messages, Web development and HTTP server, Peer2Peer, VCast (online VCR), YouTube, Flash player, monitoring webpages, Remote Desktop, SSL, SSH, et cetera); communication protocols.

==== Modem, Direct Connect, BBS managing, Fidonet, packet radio ====
- Termite, X-Term, A-Term, Baud Bandit I and II, OnLine!
- Direct parallel and serial cable connect: ParNET, SerNET
- Fidonet Mail: Amiga version of GNU AWK, AmyBW, Q-Blue QWK and Blue Wave mail readers
- BBS management: C-NET II, Zeus BBS, Hydra BBS, DLG Pro, AmiExpress, Infinity, Tempest (software)
- Packet Radio: AmiCom, AmigaTNC, and Amipac
- Amateur radio: Amiga Amateur Radio Group, AMIGA-FAX/SSTV, METEO/FAX/SSTV, PakRatt, Multicom, AmTOR, AmigaCALL.

==== AmiExpress ====
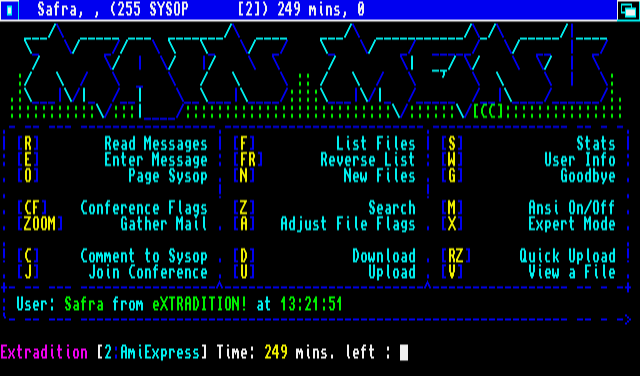
AmiExpress screenshot

AmiExpress – also known as /X – by Synthetic Technologies was a popular BBS software application for the Amiga line of computers. By 1995, AmiExpress had become one of the most popular Amiga BBS applications, and it was widely used within the warez scene for trading (exchanging) software.

AmiExpress was created and updated between 1992 and 1995. The software was originally written by Michael Thomas of Synthetic Technologies and later sold to Joseph Hodge of Lightspeed Technologies. Mike Thomas worked on AmiExpress for about two years, modelling the software after the commercial PC BBS software PCBoard. He first ran a BBS on PCBoard on a PC himself, but he was not happy with the PC platform in general and decided to make a comparable product on the Amiga.

A Usenet post (by /X author Joseph Hodge) later stated that both programming on /X and the developer company (LightSpeed Technologies Inc.) were to be dissolved, with plans for a new bulletin board system – Millennium BBS. This never surfaced.

In 2018, AmiExpress was revived by Darren Coles. He obtained permission from Joseph Hodge to continue development of the product and to continue using the name AmiExpress. Version 5.0.0 was released publicly at the end of 2018. This version was re-written in Amiga-E by taking the publicly released source code for v3 and reverse engineering the new functionality present in v4.20. It is highly backwards compatible with the v4.x versions and adds many new features and the source code is available on github.

==== BTX, Prestel, Videotel, Videotex and Minitel ====
In some European countries, and especially in France, Minitel data transmitting services were popular before the Internet. Minitel had many consumer-level communication services, including chatting, email, railway and broadcast timetables and travel and hotel booking. Minitel used little terminals rented from telephone companies or computers with modems that accept Minitel transmission protocol speed. Amiga Minitel communication programs were written in France, Germany and Italy (Amiga Videotel).

- AmigaTel (CEPT2 standard, for Minitel)
- BTX (CEPT1 standard, for the German BTX service)
- MtA (CEPT2 and CEPT3 standards, for Italian Videotex which supported both)
- Ruby View (CEPT3, for UK's Prestel)

==== Teletext, Televideo, and Viewdata ====
Teletext is an information retrieval service system based on transmitting data with normal TV broadcast signals without interfering with TV programs. Standalone programs for teletext included Amiga Teletext and the Videotex datatype.

==== FAX, answering machine and voice mail ====
- AFax, Amiga-FAX, GPFax, FaxQuik, STFax, TrapFax, AVM (software), MultiAnswer, Zyxel Voice Mail.

==== ISDN ====
ISDN digital telephone and circuit-switched telephone network system were supported via the expansion cards ISDN Master and ISDN Master II, their drivers and related software.

==== Networking and Ethernet protocols ====
Amiga supported SANA-II and MNI drivers, Envoy protocols from IAM, AS225, AS225r2 TCP-IP from Commodore, DECnet, Novell NetWare through Amiga Client for Novell NetWare, Quicknet fast proprietary peer to peer protocol, AppleTalk through emulators. Other network protocols available were AmigaUUCP, DNET, Link-It and Enlan-DFS. Amiga also supports Samba and SMBFS.

===== SANA-II drivers =====
- 3c589.device for 3Com
- a2060.device for A2060/A560 ARCNET
- a2065.device for A2065 Ethernet
- ariadne.device and ariadne_ii.device for Ariadne/Ariadne II
- cnet.device for NE2000 cards
- hydra.device for AmigaNet/AmigaNet 500
- iwan.device for ISDN
- plipbox.device for plipbox open-source Ethernet adapter using the parallel port
- ppp.device using PPP over serial line
- rh(c)slip.device using the Serial Line Internet Protocol
- sanamni.device bridge for MNI drivers
- x-surf.device, appp.device, xsurfadsl.device (PPPoE) for X-Surf/X-Surf 2

===== MNI drivers =====
- gg2-3c509.mni
- gg2-dp8390.mni
- z2-am7990.mni
- z2-dp8390.mni
- z2-mb86950.mni
- z2-smc91c90.mni

==== Internet ====

Programs to access the Web are mostly available for newer Amiga platforms.

- Amiga TCP/IP: AmiTCP, EasyNet, Genesis, Miami and Miami Deluxe, Roadshow for AmigaOS, MosNet and NetStack for MorphOS (both based on AmiTCP).
- Amiga AMP: Apache, MySQL, Perl/PHP/Python (scripting languages) solution stack AAMP.
- Browsers:
  - Old browsers or "text only" based ones:
  - Amiga Mosaic, Amiga Lynx, Emacs/W3 WWW client in GNU Emacs
  - Modern browsers up to HTML 3.2 without CSS:
    - IBrowse, Voyager, AWeb, and also Amaya through the X11 Amiga compatibility graphic engine library Cygnix
- Browsers with HTML 5 and CSS:
  - OWB (Origyn Web Browser, sometimes also referred as Odyssey Web Browser) for AmigaOS and MorphOS
  - NetSurf for AmigaOS and MorphOS
  - Timberwolf web browser for AmigaOS 4 based on Mozilla Firefox 4
- E-mail: Thor (software) YAM, Simplemail, Anubis (software)
- Newsreaders: NewsRog, MicroDot II, NewsCoaster
- Internet Radio: AmigaAMP (Amiga look-alike version of Winamp),
- Gopher: Gopherexx
- Proxy server PProxy, Privoxy
- PPP: AmiPPP, Multilink PPP
- Telnet: AmTelnet
- Podcasting: AmiPodder
- Amiga RSS feed: AmRSS
- Distributed net: DNetC
- GPS (Global Positioning System): WxWatch
- Google services:
  - GoogleMaps: Supported through OWB Browser
  - Google Earth: Supported through OWB Browser
  - GoogleMail: Supported only in 'basic HTML' mode.
  - Google Picasa: Supported through OWB Browser on all Amiga systems or directly through WAManager (MOS) dedicated software.
  - GoogleBar Toolbar: not supported by Amiga browsers
- Amiga Instant Messaging and chat: AmTalk, ACUSeeMe, AmIRC, Amiga multi-standard Instant Messaging based on Jabber Extensible Messaging and Presence Protocol, Epistula Instant Messaging, SabreMSN, MomosIRC, AmiGG, GadAmi based on popular Gadu gadu and Tlen Polish instant messaging services, WookieChat, climm, BitlBee
- Twitter: AmiTwitter for AmigaOS Classic, AmigaOS 4 and MorphOS.
- Telephony
  - Messenger voice chat: not supported
  - Skype VoIP: not supported
  - H.323 VoIP protocol: not supported
  - Amiga voice calls: It has been reported that AmTalk supports voice calls between two Amigas running that program, but this feature is unconfirmed.
- FTP: ATC (Amiga Trading Centre), Amiga wget, AmFTP, AmiFTP, GUI-FTP, HTTPResume, Charon, CManager, FTPMount (mounts remote FTP as standard Amiga devices), Pete's FTP (PFTP).
- FTP server: Amiga RC-FTPd, AmiFTPd
- Weather casting net Amiga WET, Weather Experience, Wetter.
- Live webcam supporting: AmiWebView, WebVision, WebCam
  - Amiga USB webcam driver: Personal Webcam, Amiga Sonix webcam driver for various models of USB webcams
- Clock synchronization: FACTS
- SMS Short Messages: TaskiSMS
- Web development and HTTP Server: Apache for Amiga, Apache PHP, Thttpd, Thttpd PHP, WebMaker HTML editor, Ami.HTML Webscape.
- Peer2Peer: Amiga Mule (peer-to-peer), Transmission, enqueueTorrent, BitTorrent, Bourriquet, BeeHive, CTorrent, AmiGift, EDonkey, mlDonkey
- VCast, Online VCR: otrMUI for MorphOS by Thomas Igracki
- YouTube: On AmigaOS and MorphOS there are various clients or downloaders for YouTube all based upon scripts made by the ARexx language. These scripts spare some functions from existing Amiga programs like wget and MPlayer and join them in a big meta-application utility able to handle YouTube animations: YouTube downloader.rexx, ib youtube.rexx loading YouTube movies into Amiga browser IBrowse, getvideo.rexx, and YouTube client TubeXX, Flayer ARexx script.
- Flash player: Amiga SWFPlayer
- Monitoring webpages: Seventhsense
- Remote desktop: TwinVNC, VNCServer, MorphVNC
- Pretty Good Privacy: 2.6.3i.
- SSL, SSH: AmiSSL, Amiga OpenSSL, Amiga OpenSSH, SSHCON
- Web album photo sharing services: WAManager (for MorphOS) handles Google Picasa web album service.
- Other: Sniffy, Net Tools (net ping, resolve, traceroute, etc.), Gallerius (generator of HTML galleries)

==== Communication protocols ====
Skypix is an Amiga communication protocol. It was one of the first interactive online graphics-and-sound protocols. It was introduced in 1987 as part of the Skyline (Atredes) bulletin board system (BBS), running on the Skyline BBS and Skyterm terminal. Years before the World Wide Web, Skypix allowed rich interactive graphics and sound, as well as mouse control, to be a part of the online experience, which was until then limited to text and ANSI graphics. Skypix allowed users to write and integrate graphical programs, and included the first "authoring program", Skypaint. Skypix created enthusiastic game and online application writers years before the World Wide Web made such features a common part of the online experience. It was quickly abandoned as more advanced markup languages for BBS became available and due to the emerging of Internet phenomenon that marginalized the BBS system of communication.

=== Programming ===
Despite the variety of programming languages and compilers, most development was done using C and C++, 680x0 assembler and various Basic dialects.

=== Multimedia ===
- Movie players: DvPlayer by A-EON Technology (for AmigaOS 4.x), Frogger Player, MooVID player, SoftCinema, AmiDogMoviePlayer, mPlayer, MysticView, VLC (for MorphOS).
- Media Center: AMC a multiplatform multimedia center realized with Amiga Hollywood piloting mPlayer.
- Internet Radio: TuneNet and its front-end Amuse, AmigaAMP and AmiAMP (similar to Winamp), AmiNetRadio
- Music: Kaya Player, Hippo player, CD Player, PlayOGG, HivelyPlay, Play16
- Special players and music modules players: XMP Module player, ADPlay for AdLib modules
- MIDI players: TiMidity, DG Midi Player
- Image viewers: Multiview, Showgirls, SView5, MiniShowPicture, PicShow, SimpleView
- Image cataloguers: PhotoAlbum
- Flash SWF file editing: SWFTools Open Source set of flash .swf files utilities
- Flash SWF file playing: simple basic Flash Player for MorphOS, Gnash for AmigaOS 4.1, Swfdec (integrated as Plug-In for Origyn Web Browser for MorphOS).
- Encoding video: 3ivx, FFmpeg, Mpeg2Enc, Mpeg2vidcodec, MEncoder
- Encoding audio: LAME, FLAC, ADPCM
- PowerPoint ".PPT" files: PointRider
- Adobe Systems ".PDF" files: APDF
- Digital cameras: Canon toolbox for Canon photocameras, PtpDigCam, SimpleCam, AmiCaMedia, DigiCam, CamControl, Camedia, IOSUB Digicam Package, VHI Studio
- TV cards players: Amithlon TV, Visionary, AmiTV and VailantVision that is an evolution of Amihlon TV.
- Java: It exists only old versions of Kaffe Java, from Geek Gadgets project. It worked under X11 graphical engine but without AWT, or with very pre-release alpha versions of abstraction windows toolkits. Other ports such as AmJay or Daytona were dismissed before reaching a working status.

==== Drivers for multimedia devices and special input functions ====
- Multimedia keyboards: MMKeyboard
- Hand-writing recognition: Meridian is a program that performs handwriting recognition input functions using a stylus like those equipping any tablet PC, emulating the stylus by mouse.
- Graphics tablets: FormAldiHyd, GTDriver, and SlateCtrl are shareware/freeware drivers for several serial-port graphics tablets. "mousev1b" is a driver to use an Apple Newton as a graphics tablet.

===== Accessibility software =====
- Jakeboard input software and hardware emulation keyboard and mouse was used by persons with physical limitations and/or problems of movements. Software and hardware schemes are downloadable at BlackBeltSystems Amiga Software page.
- Talkboard similar to jakeboard, is a downloadable speech-generation system for persons.

==== Optical media ====
Alternative filesystems included AsimCDFS, AmiCDROM, CDVDFS, Allegro CDFS and CacheCDFS.

BurnIt!, Frying Pan, MakeCD, AmiDVD, DVDRecord, DVDAuthor could burn CDs, DVDs and/or Blu-ray media.

MakeCD was the first Amiga program to support Disk At Once (DAO). Frying Pan was the first Amiga program capable to create DVDs. Frying Pan and BurnIt! are capable to handle DVD.

BlueHD from German programmer Carsten Siegner is a MorphOS program capable of authoring and burning HD-DVDs in these formats:

- Normal Video-DVD (European PAL)
- HD-Video-DVD HDTV (mkv-h264/AAC) (that are recognized by some Blu-ray players)
- HD-Video-DVD HDTV (MP4-h264/AVC)

===== Disk images and ISO files management =====
- ISO-o-Matic software is a CD image converting software and supports b5i, bin, CD-i, img (normal/CloneCD), mdf (Alcohol 120%), nrg (Nero Burning ROM), pdi and uif.
- ISOMount mounts CD ISOs, PC floppy disk images and Amiga disk images. It supports: Amiga (ADF) 880 KB either OFS and FFS, MS-DOS (IMG) from 360 KB up to 2.88 MB (Fat12), Atari ST 800 KB (Fat12), MAC GS (file image of Mac has no extensions) 800 KB (MFM encoded), CD (ISO) – every size, including floppy-specific.
- MountVirtual and DiskImage programs for AmigaOS and MorphOS that mount CD ISO images as standard Amiga devices. Supports CD ISO images and disk images such as ADF, DMS, IFS. MountVirtual requires DiskImage.
- VirtualCD uses ISOs and CD images as virtual drives.
- mkisofs and Amkisofs are ports of MaKeISOFileSystem.

(A complete list of ISO managements and converters is available on Aminet.)

=== Utilities ===
AmiDock creates application launching docks on the desktop. It became popular in 1989–1990, due to the NeXT computer, that used the same 68030 processor as Amiga 3000) and that it also had the Acorn Archimedes RISC OS docking station utility. In Great Britain, Archimedes computers were adopted in schools. Young Amiga users (there were 1,500,000 Amigas sold in the United Kingdom) spotted docks on Archimedes at school and asked for it on Amiga also. Various launch bars or docking utilities were born as third-party hobby utilities (many examples of early docking software for Amiga like the ToolManager are still hosted in the Aminet repository of all Amiga free software, in the "Utility" directory) and then Amidock was officially integrated in AmigaOS with version 3.9.

Directory Opus was a file utility program. When this software was released, Amiga magazines proclaimed that it was the most important software ever released for the Amiga and "should be built into the operating system". Directory Opus went on to create a "replacement OS" for Workbench which overlaid itself upon the system. It started as a file manager, and then became a complete desktop replacement and an alternative to the official Workbench. The utility was later ported to Windows and remains widely used.

HyperCache (written by Dave Plummer) was the first commercial disk caching software. Significant in that the base operating system lacked this ability, the addition of caching significantly improved the performance of both floppy and hard discs.

SysSpeed was a shareware benchmarking program for Amigas equipped with Motorola 68k and PowerPC CPUs.

Much shareware and free software was written for the Amiga and could be obtained via the Fred Fish disk series or from the Aminet software archive.

Because the custom chipset shares RAM (and therefore the memory bus) with the CPU, throughput increases measurably if the display is disabled. Some processor-intensive software, such as 3D renderers, disable the display during calculation to gain speed.

== Games ==
With an extensive library of games released, the Amiga had a reputation for being the "gold standard" of gaming, as the most cutting-edge titles of the time were often developed for the system. Its killer app, Cinemaware's Defender of the Crown, was one such game. Aside from that, early popular commercial releases were typically conversions of games for Atari ST. The Amiga benefitted from the 1987 launch of the affordable Amiga 500 and the computer's open architecture, and it would find a niche as a gaming platform among smaller studios and bedroom programmers in Europe, peeking in the early 1990s. Many highly innovative classics also originated on the platform.

== Demos ==
The Amiga was a focal point for the "demo scene". The Amiga thrived on public domain, freeware and other not-for-profit development. The demo scene spearheaded development in multimedia programming techniques for the Amiga, such that it was de rigueur for the latest visual tricks, soundtrackers and 3D algorithms from the demo scene to end up being used in computer game development.

== Piracy ==
Because Amiga was one of the first game-oriented computers to feature a built-in floppy disk drive, it simplified software piracy. Many of the arguments pertaining to software copying, intellectual property rights in software, the open-source movement by the early 1990s. It was not unusual for demo groups to be openly involved in software piracy.

Anti-piracy measures included the practice of distributing software on disks that contained secret "keys" on high-numbered tracks that were officially unused. The Amiga disk drive officially supported tracks 0–79 from a double-density disk, but could actually read tracks 80 through 82. Standard disk-imaging software ignored these tracks, so that a duplicate of a boxed disk would not contain the key and the software would not work. A similar technique involved writing to normally-unused sectors of the disk. Copy software called "nibble" copiers appeared that could exactly reproduce such disks.

Publishers turned to other methods. Hardware dongles were occasionally used for high-end software. AmigaHASP protected Rashumon and was sold by HarmonySoft to Aladdin Systems. Some software manufacturers asked users to type a word from a particular page number and line number of the manual, meaning that successfully copying software included photocopying a large quantity of text. Sometimes the text was designed so that photocopiers would produce illegible copies, meaning that pirates had to manually add the text.

Pirates responded with "cracking" software that altered the code to bypass copy protection completely. Every protection scheme was eventually broken. One near exception was the scheme on Dragon's Lair, which became the "holy grail" of crackers worldwide, but it was also broken.

== "Decrunching" ==
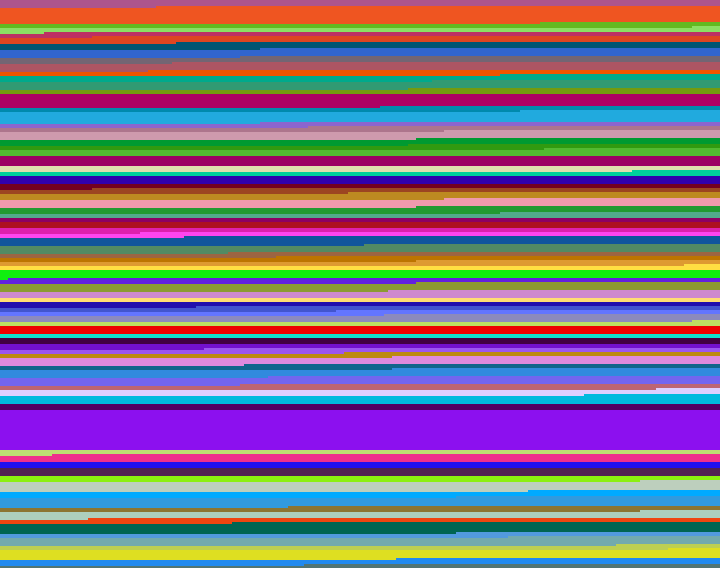
During decompression, programs "often display a flashing screen with striped lines", as in this single frame of a typical decrunching screen, "and a flashing mouse pointer, or the screen may shake and look distorted."

The standard Amiga floppy disk drive allows 880 KB on a single disk, comparable to the RAM of most Amigas (512 KB to 1 MB). To increase capacity, Amiga uses data compression, or "decrunching". Early implementations wrote the compressed data into one part of free RAM, then decompressed into another part. Later implementations would decompress data while it loads, destroying the compressed data in the RAM upon decompression to make room for new data and making disks storing more than 1 MB of data in its uncompressed form practical.

=== TransADF ===
TransADF is a program that transfers the contents of a floppy disk or a similar block device to a file. This program can compress the disk image using the popular deflate algorithm, as utilized by PKZIP and gzip, amongst others.

== Notes ==
1. Aminet tree, Aminet Statistics
2. WHDload site download section reports that this program supports actually 1991 games (and it is far from creating a complete list of all Amiga games).
3. Lemon Amiga (a program that adds MAMElike interface to WinUAE Amiga emulator) reports in its statistics window section 3453 known Amiga games.
4. Obligement France reported in January 2009 a list of 13,528 known Amiga games, as divided in 12,416 original games, 953 games extensions or data disks for original games, 125 level editors or game editors for existing games, 34 loaders to let Amiga run some games created on other platforms.
5. Ars Technica: A history of the Amiga, part 4: Enter Commodore, By Jeremy Reimer. October 21, 2007
6. Existing Amiga-like operating system are AmigaOS, AROS, and MorphOS
7. Transformer Emulation Software article page at Brantford Personal Computer Museum online site
8. Interview by Jim Sachs in March 2009, from Amiga Polish Portal (Polskim Portalu Amigowym)
9. Jim Sachs presents himself on site of SereneScreen Aquarium screensaver program
10. Review of ProWrite on Compute! Magazine, issue 88, September 1987
11. Chronology of Amiga Computers at pctimeline.info
12. Advertising from Wordperfect on InfoWorld Magazine, issue 30, January 21, 1987, page 34 (retrieved from Brief history of Wordperfect at Cunningham & Cunningham Inc., object-oriented programming consultancy firm based in Portland, Oregon, USA, members of Wordperfect Universe User Group)
