= AmiKit =

Software compilation for Amiga computers

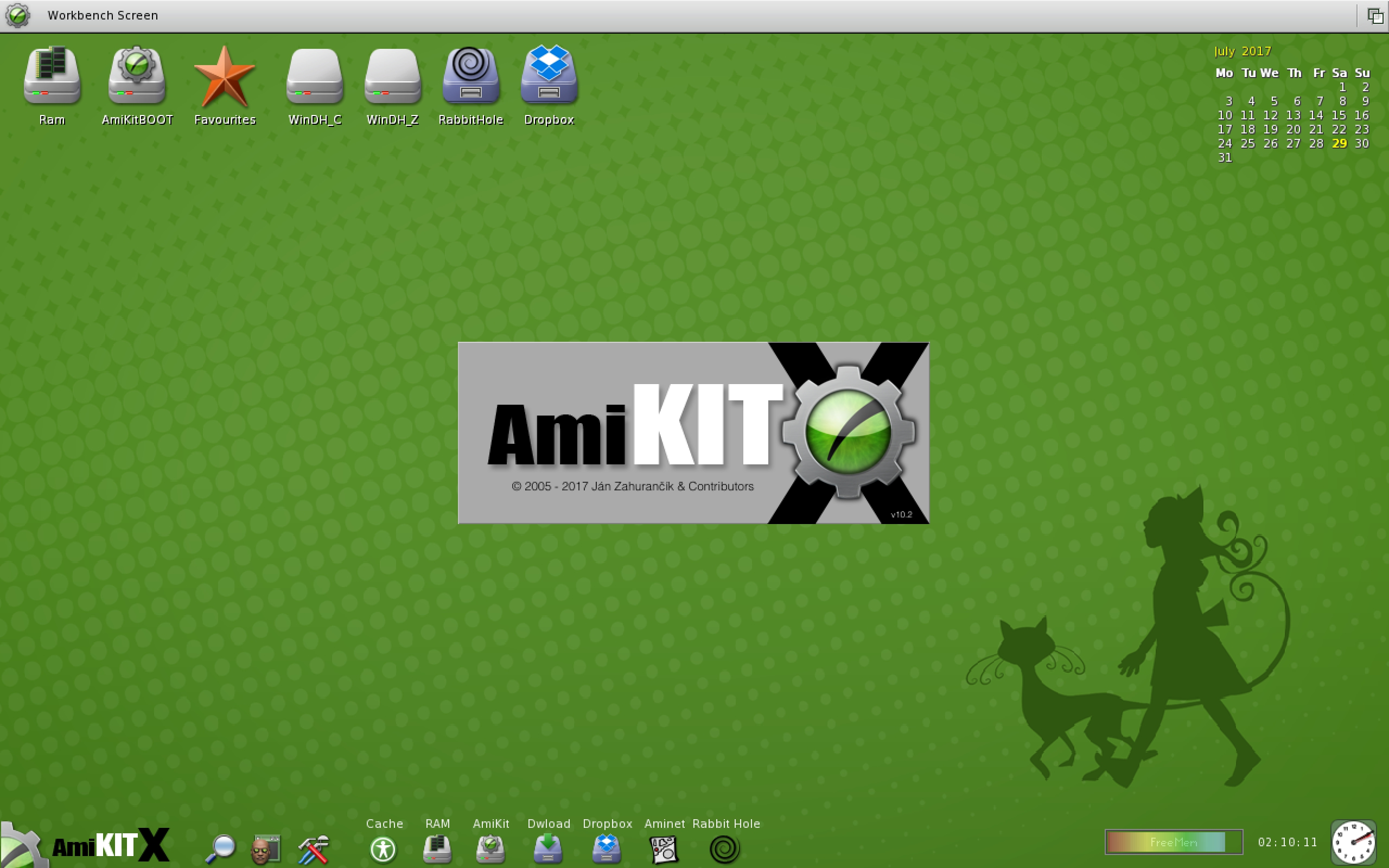
- Screenshot of AmiKit X first released in 2017
- Developer: Ján Zahurančík & Contributors
- OS family: AmigaOS
- Working state: Publicly released
- Initial release: 2005; 20 years ago
- Latest release: XE (12.2) / July 13, 2023; 2 years ago
- Available in: Multilingual
- Update method: automatic via Live Update
- Supported platforms: Windows, Mac OS, Linux, AmigaOS (Vampire)
- License: Freeware Commercial
- Official website: amikit.amiga.sk

AmiKit is a compilation of 425 pre-installed and pre-configured Amiga programs (Amiga software built for Motorola 68000 series CPUs) running on Windows, macOS, Linux, and Amiga computers with a Vampire V2 card.

== Features ==
Key features of the software include:

- The Directory, Opus Magellan, and Scalos desktop environments.
- 425 pre-installed and pre-configured Amiga programs (tools, utilities, games, and demos) freely available from Aminet and other sources.
- The "Rabbit Hole" feature, which allows the launch of Windows, Mac, or Linux applications directly from the Amiga desktop.
- Support for a range of resolutions including HD Ready (720p), FullHD (1080p), 4K UHD (2160p), 6K, and 8K UHD (4320p).
- TrueType fonts, Dual PNG icons (by Ken Lester), and 24-bit visual themes (including Dark Mode, Modern Retro, etc.).
- Dropbox support.

== Requirements ==
AmiKit requires Windows 7 (or newer), macOS (10.9 or newer), Linux (x86/64 able to run PlayOnLinux), a Raspberry Pi, or a Vampire V2 turbo card for a classic Amiga.

For AmiKit to work, the original AmigaOS (version 3.x) and Kickstart ROM (version 3.1) are required. The following sources are supported:

- AmigaOS XL CD or ISO.
- AmigaOS 3.9 CD or ISO (also available in Amiga Forever from Cloanto, including the required Kickstart ROM).
- AmigaOS 3.5 CD or ISO.
- AmigaOS 3.1 available on AmigaOS 4.1 FE CD or ISO from Hyperion Entertainment (also includes the required Kickstart ROM).
- AmigaOS 3.1.4 ZIP from Hyperion Entertainment (also includes the required Kickstart ROM).
- AmigaOS 3.2 from Hyperion Entertainment (AmiKit for Vampire only).

== See also ==
- Amiga
- AmigaOS
- UAE (emulator)
- Emulator
