= Origyn Web Browser =

Open source web browser

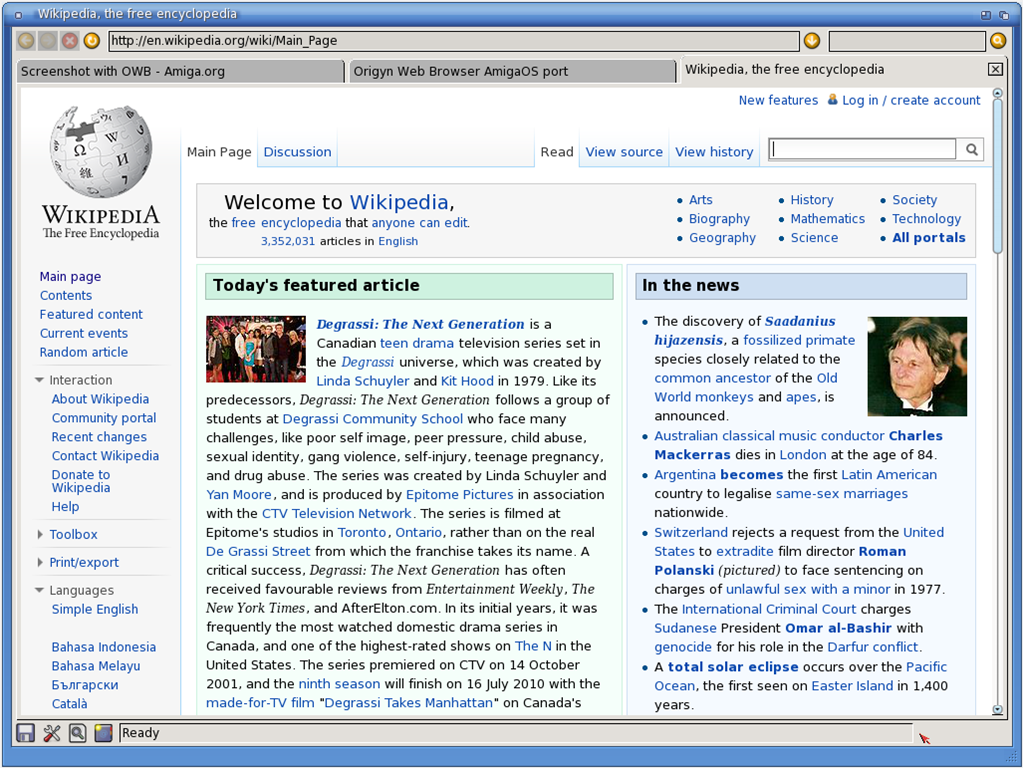
- OWB running on AROS showing Wikipedia
- Developers: Sand-labs, Fabien Coeurjoly
- Stable release: 1.25 (AROS only); 1.23r4 (AmigaOS 4 only); 1.24 (15 April 2014; 12 years ago) [±]
- Written in: C++
- Operating system: AmigaOS, AROS, MorphOS
- Available in: 12
- Type: Web browser
- License: BSD-3-Clause
- Website: http://fabportnawak.free.fr/owb/

Origyn Web Browser (OWB) is a discontinued web browser that was synchronized with WebKit and sponsored by the technology company Pleyo. OWB provides a meta-port to an abstract platform with the aim of making porting to embedded or lightweight systems faster and easier. This port is used for embedded devices such as set-top boxes, and other consumer electronics.

OWB has also found popularity on the AmigaOS-like operating systems. Current versions include AmigaOS, AROS and MorphOS official ports.

When Sand-labs disappeared, MorphOS developer Fabien Coeurjoly took over and eventually renamed project to Odyssey Web Browser when it did not have any original Sand-labs code left.

== History ==
OWB was created by Pleyo, a French software firm located in Montpellier, France in 2006.

== Versions ==
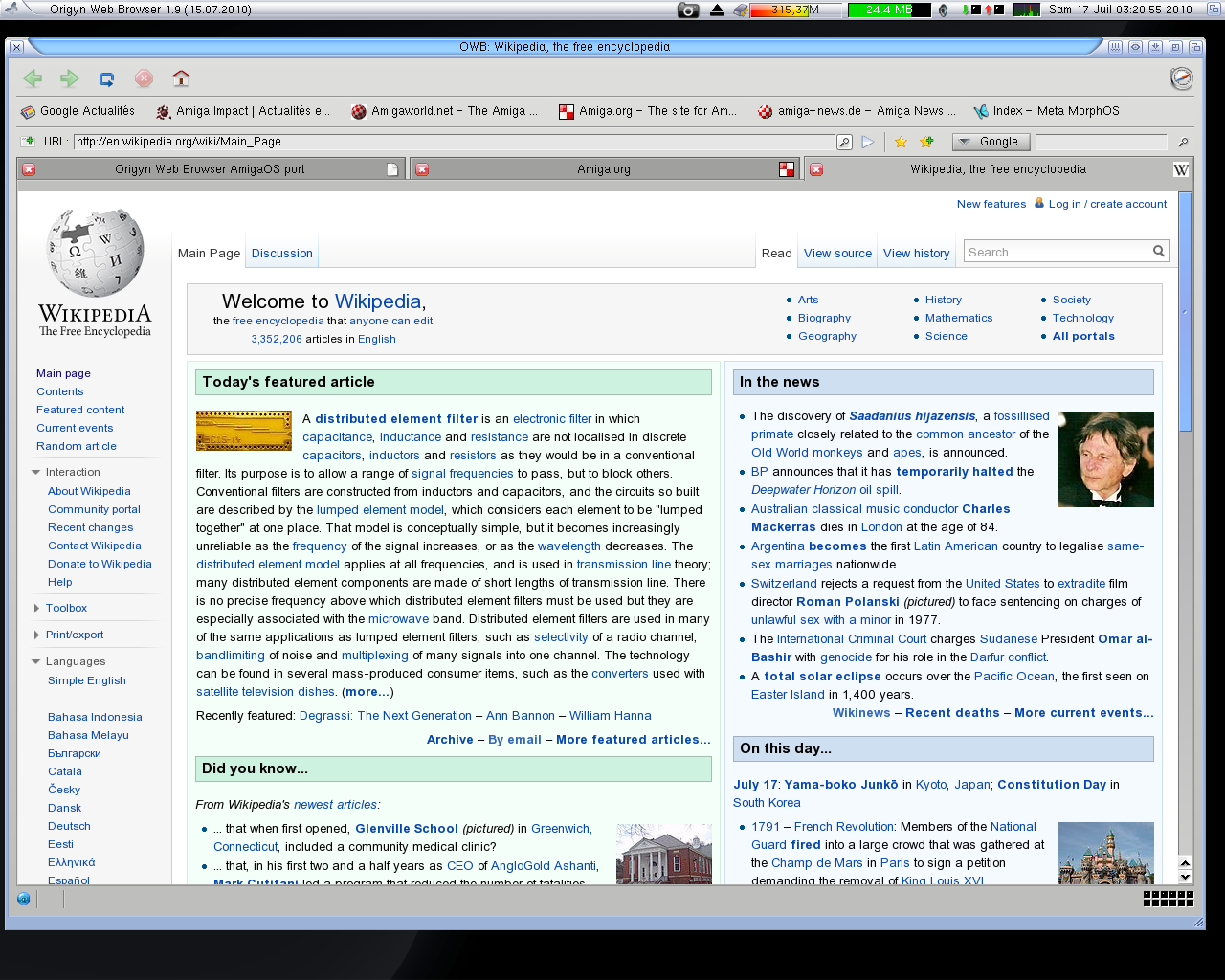
OWB 1.9 running on MorphOS

Milestone versions of Origyn Web Browser:

- Robespierre – November 22, 2007
- Blastoise – July 1, 2008
- DoDuo – July 1, 2008
- Galekid – December 19, 2008
- Galegon – February 11, 2009
- Galeking – June 4, 2009
- Pukapuka – October 8, 2009

Announced:

- Pukarua – unreleased

== Features ==
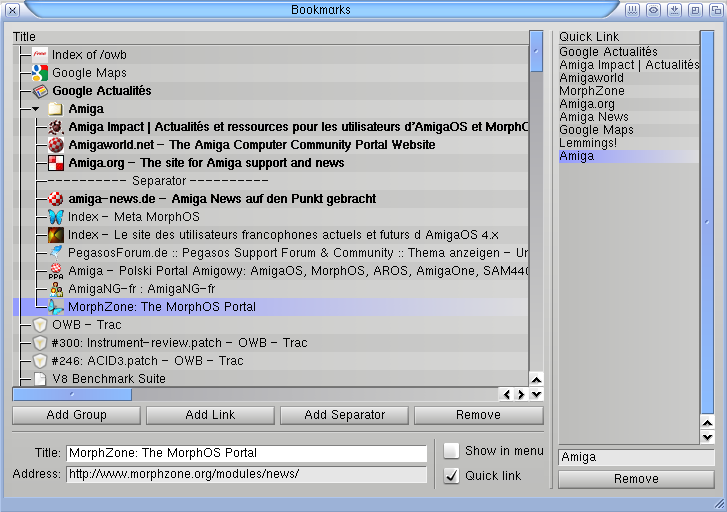
OWB bookmark manager

OWB is a web browser optimized for consumer electronics (CE) devices and embedded system, such as mobile phones, portable media players, set-top boxes (STB) and TV decoders, and various other consumer electronic products such as GPS, home-gateways, Web-radios, digital video recorder (PVR), DVD recorders, Wireless devices, etc.

OWB is based on Webkit by Apple, and its ease of porting is based upon a browser abstraction layer called OWBAL. The existence of this abstraction layer architecture dramatically eases the task of integrating OWB in CE devices, resulting in fast and easy implementation on target platforms. The aim of the abstraction layer is to allow CE software producers to leverage extant libraries, instead of needing to port the browser and its full set of dependencies.

OWBAL abstraction is based on interfaces, which are described through abstract classes, and these classes contain only pure virtual methods. No default implementation is allowed.

=== General characteristics ===
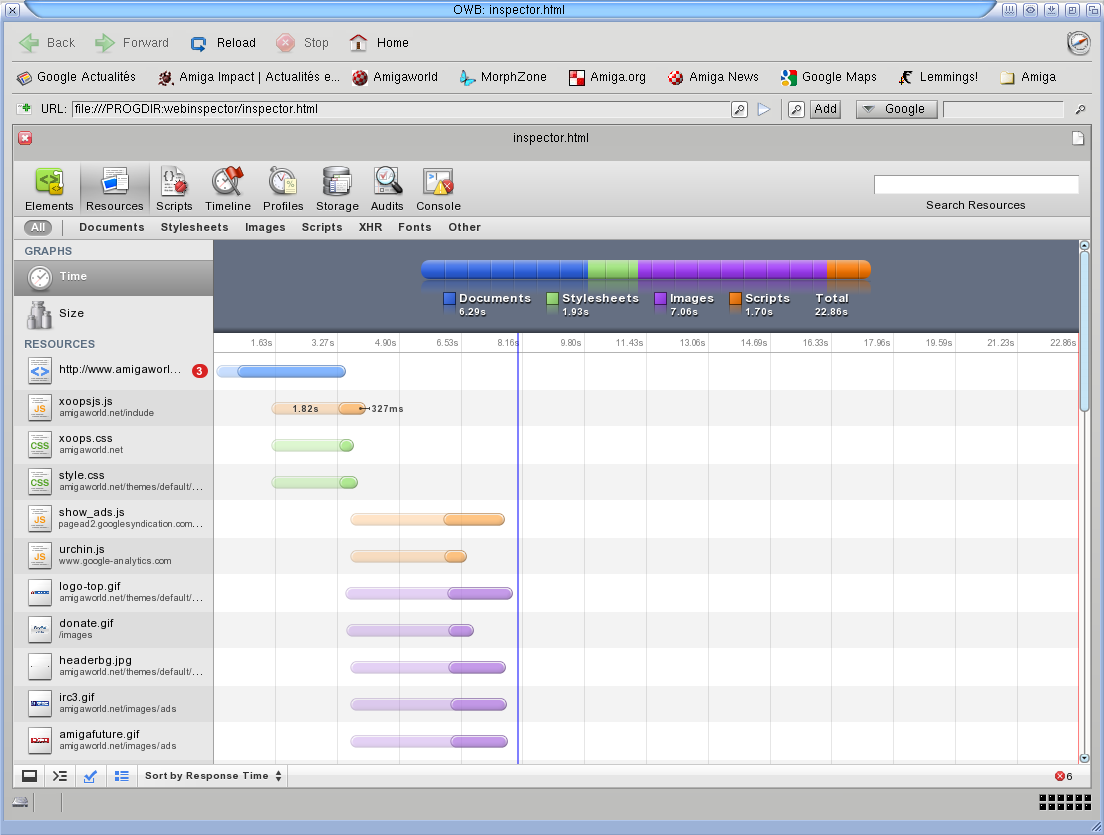
OWB web inspector analyzing resource use

OWB supports full Cascading Style Sheet (CSS) 2.1, CSS3 support, styleable form controls, enhanced rich text editing, XML technologies, XPath (GTK port), SVG (partial SVG 1.1 full) (GTK port, Qt port and Amiga port), XSLT processor, JavaScript API for XSLT, MathML, notifications, SquirrelFish Extreme (SFX) on x86, HTML5.

OWB features Netscape-style (NPAPI) plug-ins (GTK and MorphOS ports) including support for mplayer, Adobe Flash Player and DiamondX.

The browser can pass Acid2 test with a 100% evaluation on all ports and Acid3 test with a 99% evaluation on SDL port and a 100% evaluation on ports for GTK, Qt, Amiga, and MorphOS.

It features also accessibility support and support for cross document messaging, databases, datagrid, dom storage, filtera, geolocation, icon database, offline web application, server-sent events, sharedWorker video/audio, WebSockets, Worker and 3D support.

Platform graphics engines include GTK, Qt, SDL, Cairo with Magic User Interface and Win32 (not yet public).

The font engine used is Freetype.

OWB is also POSIX compliant.

Origyn can handle threads (with Pthreads) and supports GTK, Qt and uClibc.

== Odyssey Web Browser ==
Odyssey Web Browser is probably the most mature of the Amiga and Amigalike-OS ports, as it has a download manager and much of the other UI features of a modern browser already separately added by its developer. Version 1.6 (December 2009) sports Adobe Flash SWF player plug-in based on Swfdec, version 1.6.1 has been integrated with web profiling and debugging tool called Webinspector. Since version 1.7 (March 2010), Odyssey supports also HTML5 tags and media content through FFmpeg.

MorphOS release of OWB is also distributed in a Lite version for the minimal computer motherboard Efika.

== Screenshots ==
The following are several screenshots showing the various features of OWB.

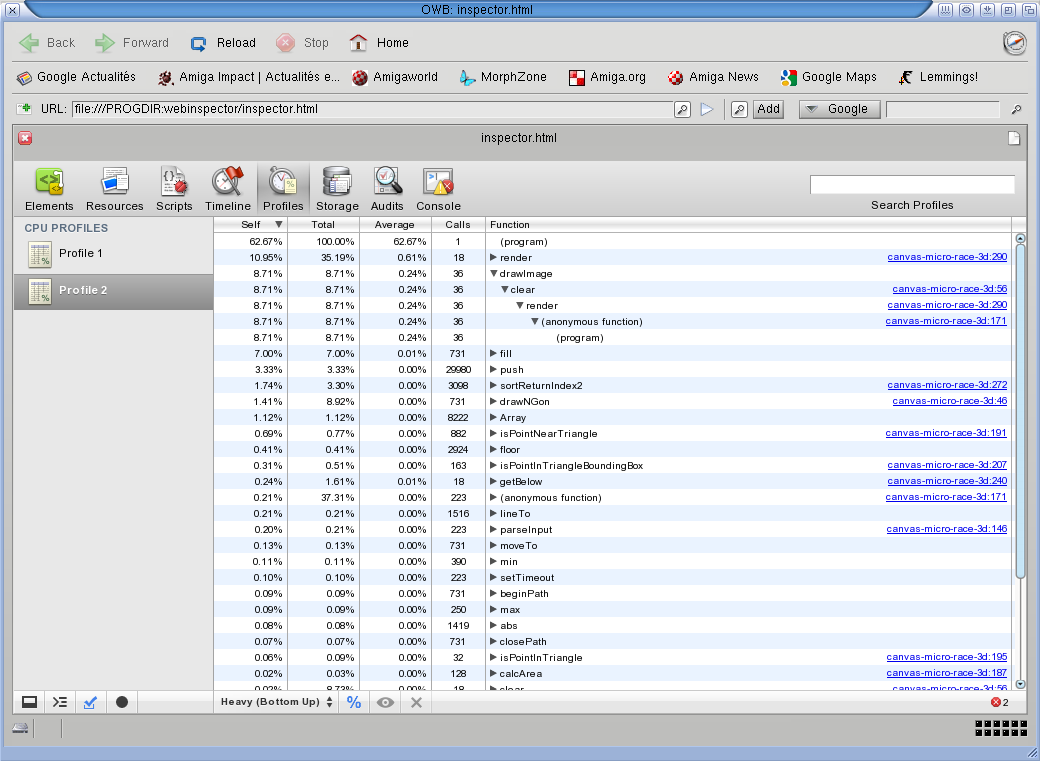
Profiler

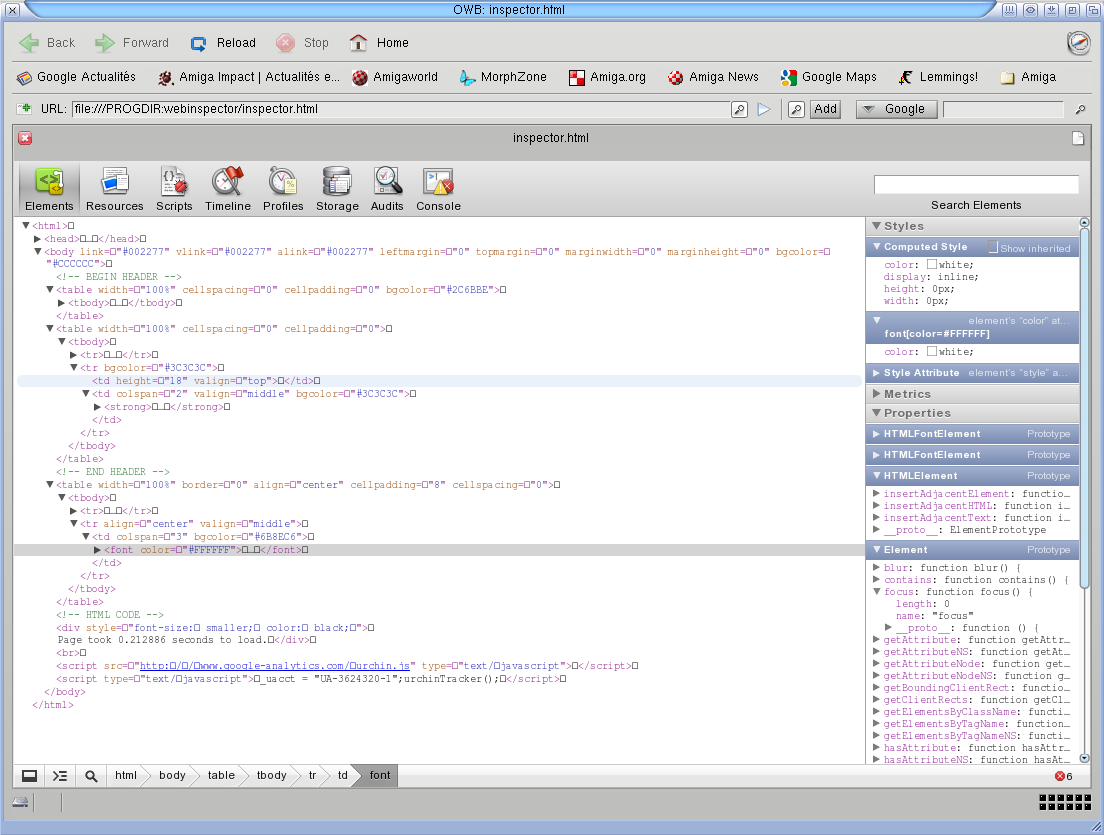
Elements inspector

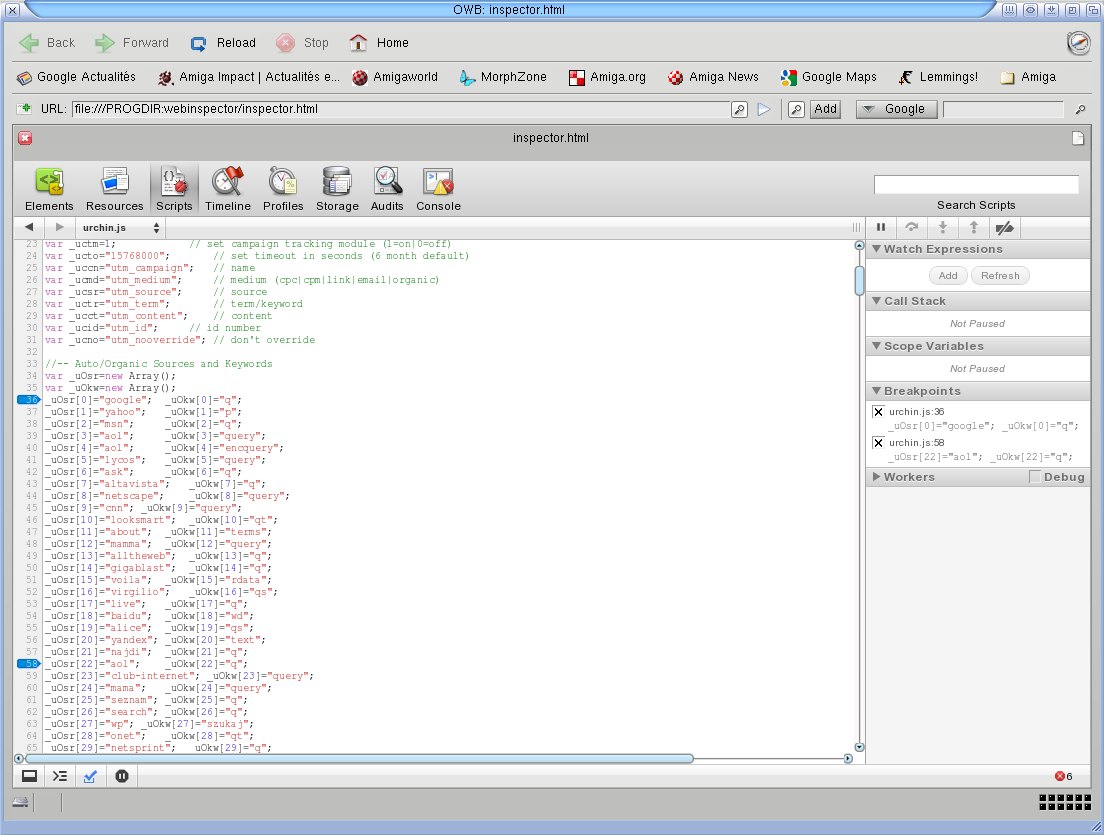
Debugger

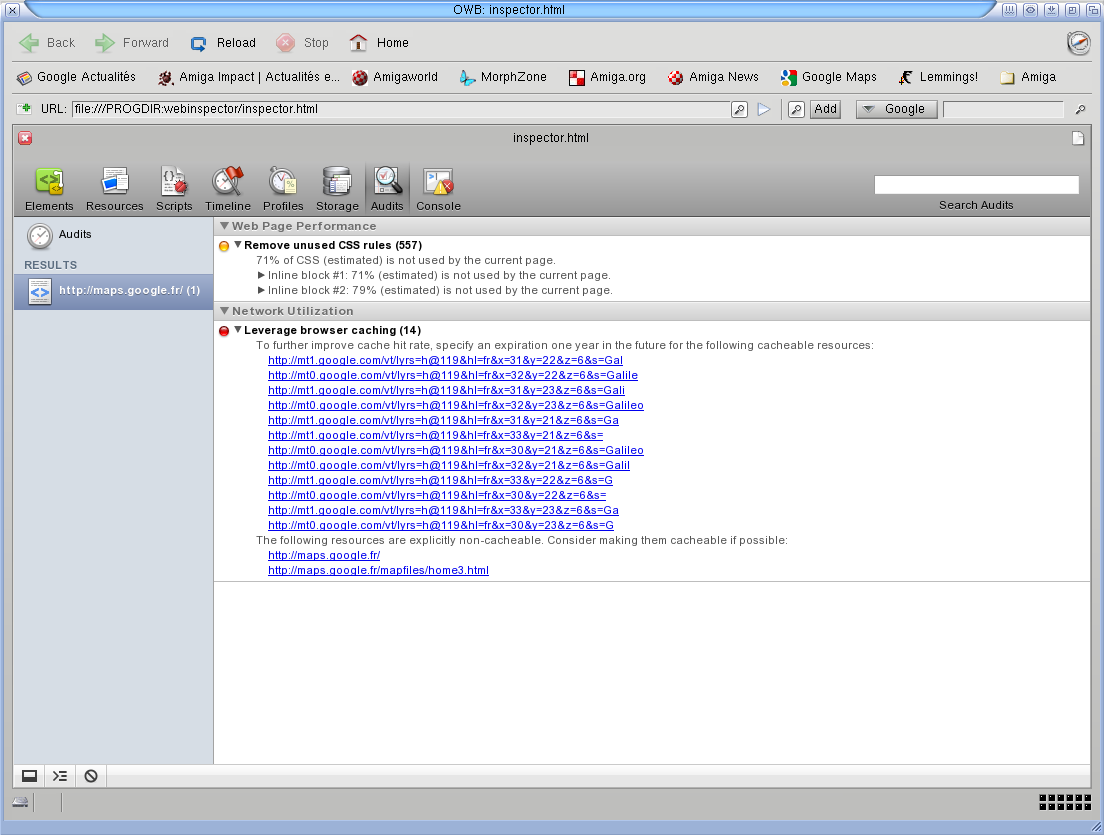
Auditor

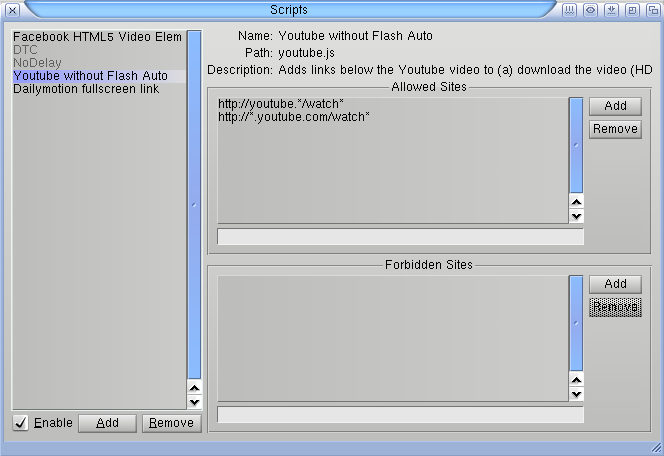
Script manager

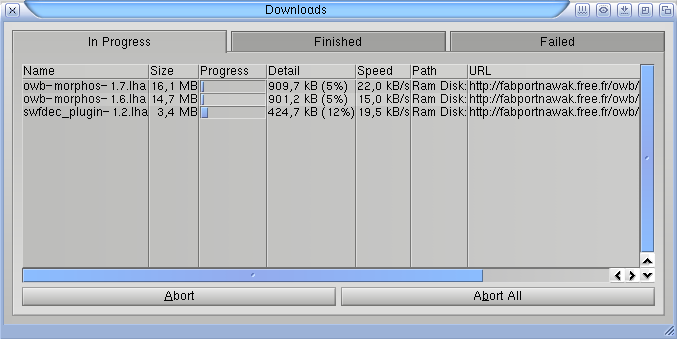
Download manager

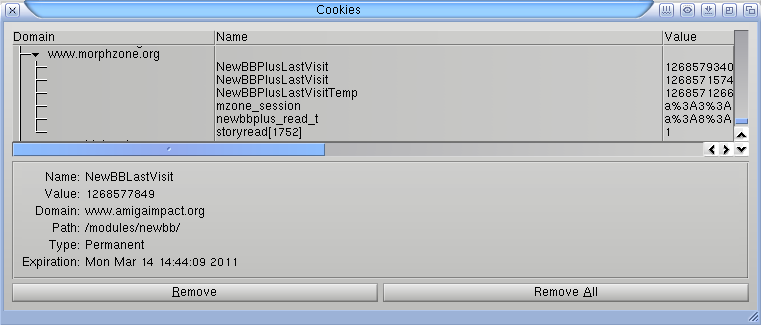
Cookie manager

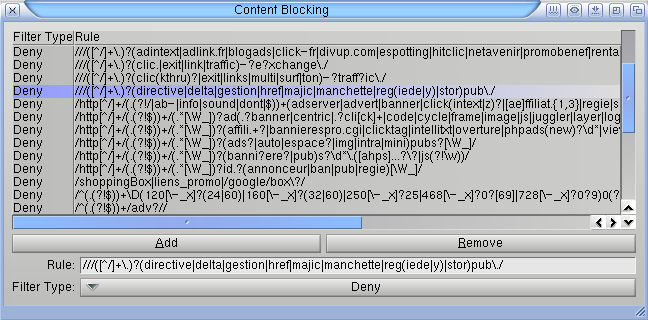
Content blocking

== See also ==
- Comparison of web browsers
- List of web browsers

=== Other web browsers for MorphOS/AmigaOS ===
- AMosaic
- AWeb
- NetSurf
- IBrowse
- Voyager
- TimberWolf
