= 3Com 3c509 =

Ethernet network card line

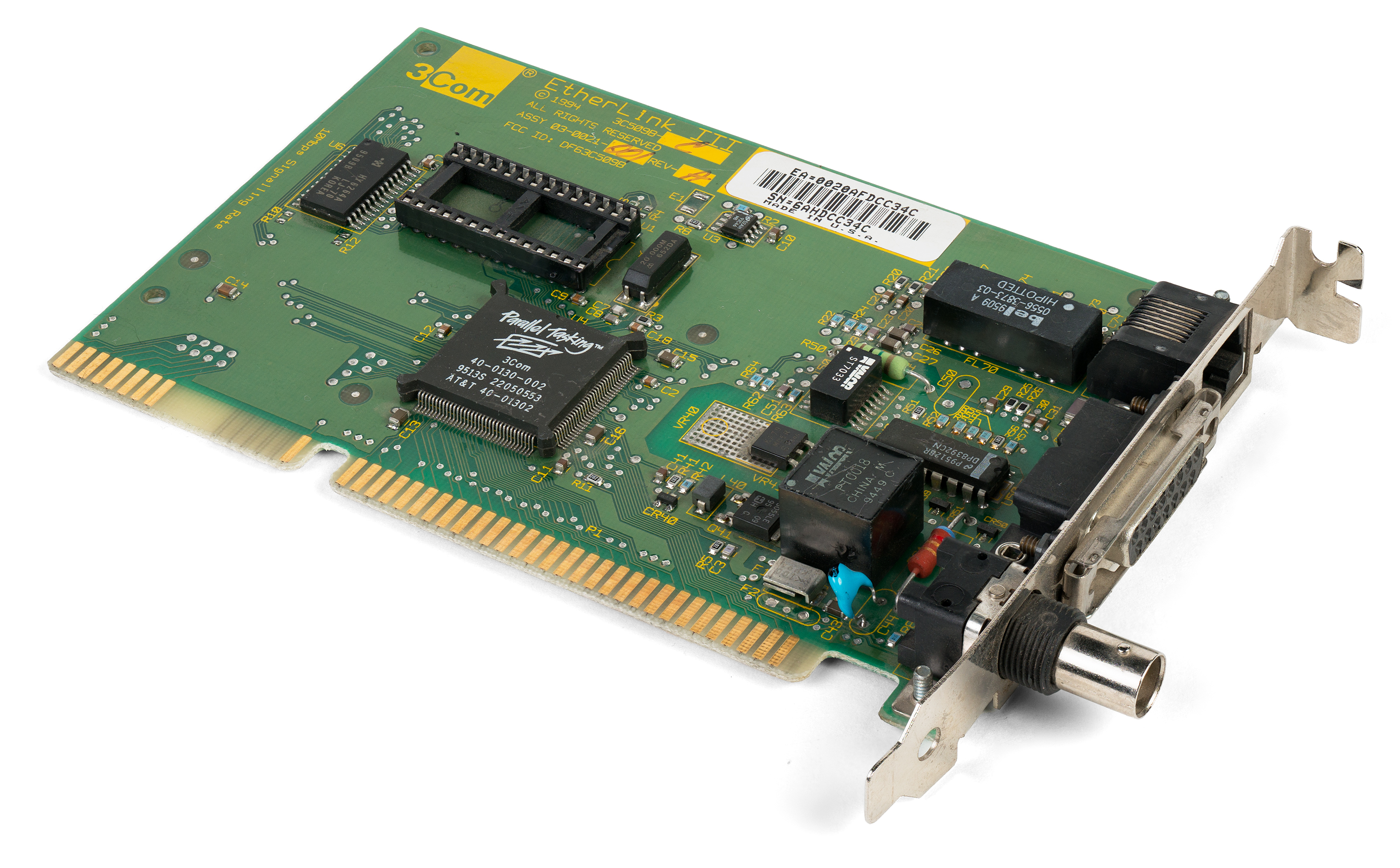
3Com 3c509B-Combo card (3C509BC), second generation for the ISA 16-bit bus and 10BASE-T, AUI and 10BASE-2.

3Com 3c509 is a line of Ethernet IEEE 802.3 network cards for the ISA, EISA, MCA and PCMCIA computer buses. It was designed by 3Com and put on the market in 1992, followed by the improved version 3c509B in 1994.

== Features ==
The 3Com 3c5x9 family of network controllers has various interface combinations of computer bus including ISA, EISA, MCA, and PCMCIA. For network connection, 10BASE-2, AUI and 10BASE-T are used.

Physical card configurations

Combinations for Etherlink III
Adapter number	Bus	Network	Connector
3C509-TPO	ISA	10BASE-T	8P8C
3C509B-TPO	ISA	10BASE-T	8P8C
3C509-TP	ISA	10BASE-T, AUI	8P8C, DA-15
3C509B-TP	ISA	10BASE-T, AUI	8P8C, DA-15
3C509B-TPC	ISA	10BASE-T, 10BASE2	8P8C, BNC
3C509-Coax	ISA	AUI, 10BASE2	DA-15, BNC
3C509B-Coax	ISA	AUI, 10BASE2	DA-15, BNC
3C509-Combo	ISA	10BASE-T, AUI, 10BASE2	8P8C, DA-15, BNC
3C509B-Combo	ISA	10BASE-T, AUI, 10BASE2	8P8C, DA-15, BNC
3C579	EISA	AUI, 10BASE2	DA-15, BNC
3C579-TP	EISA	10BASE-T, AUI	8P8C, DA-15
3C529	MCA	AUI, 10BASE2	DA-15, BNC
3C529-TP	MCA	10BASE-T, AUI	8P8C, DA-15
3C589-TP	PCMCIA	10BASE-T	8P8C
3C589B-TP	PCMCIA	10BASE-T	8P8C
3C589-Combo	PCMCIA	10BASE-T, 10BASE2	8P8C, BNC
3C589B-Combo	PCMCIA	10BASE-T, 10BASE2	8P8C, BNC

B = On ISA and PCMCIA, adapter numbers indicate that these adapters are part of the second generation of the Parallel Tasking EtherLink III technology.

The DIP-28 (U1) EPROM for network booting may be 8, 16, or 32 KB in size. This means EPROMs of type 64, 128, and 256 kbit (2^10) are compatible, like the 27C256.

Boot ROM address is located between 0xC0000 - 0xDE000.

== Teardown example, the 3c509B-Combo ==
The Etherlink III 3C509B-Combo is registered with the FCC ID DF63C509B. The main components on the card are Y1: crystal oscillator 20 MHz, U50: coaxial transceiver interface DP8392, U4: main controller 3Com 9513S (or 9545S etc.), U6: 8 kB 70 ns CMOS static RAM, U1: DIP-28 27C256 style EPROM for boot code, U3: 1024 bit 5V CMOS Serial EEPROM (configuration).

Detailed teardown
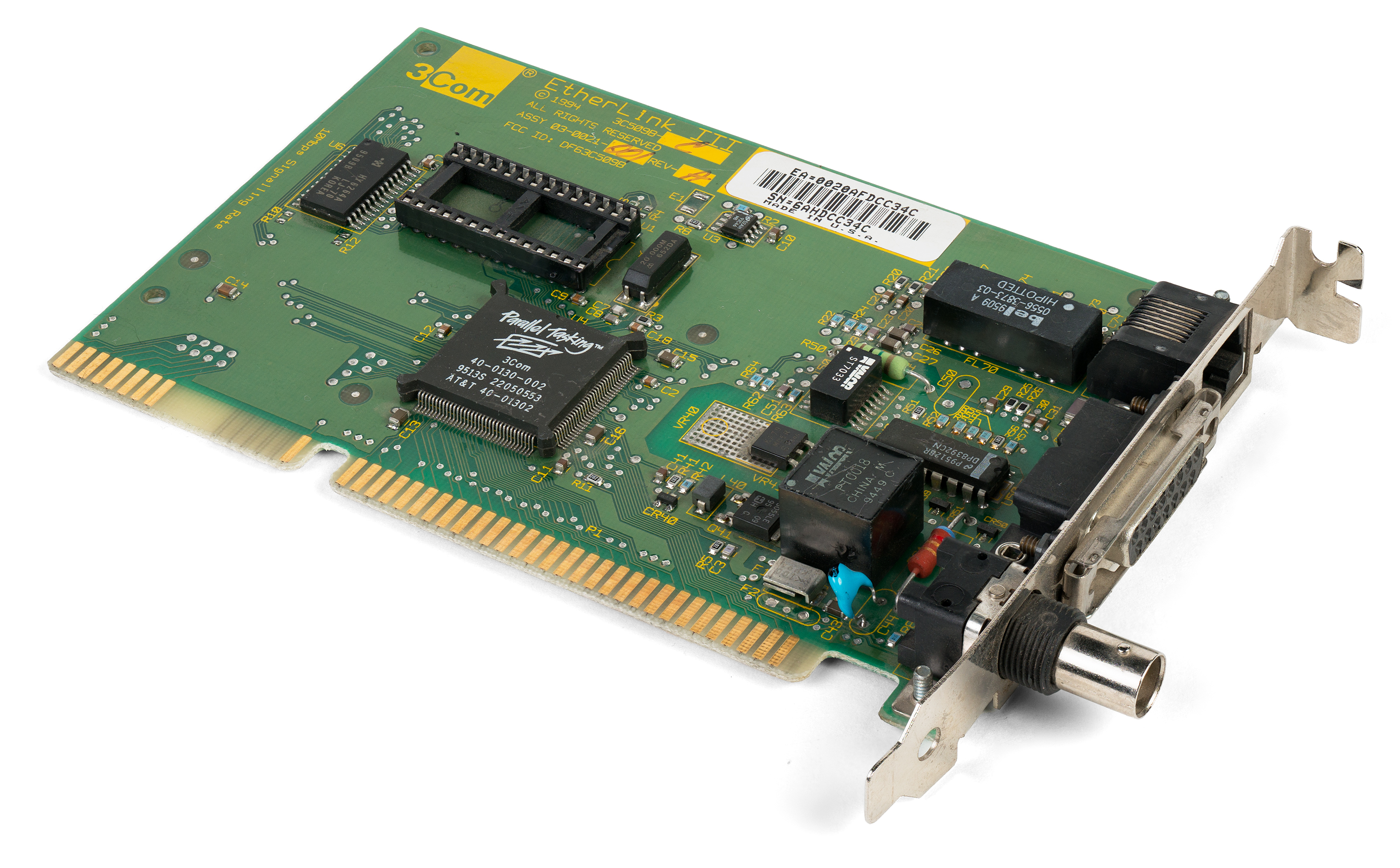
3C509B-Combo 1994 ASSY 03-0021-001 REV-A

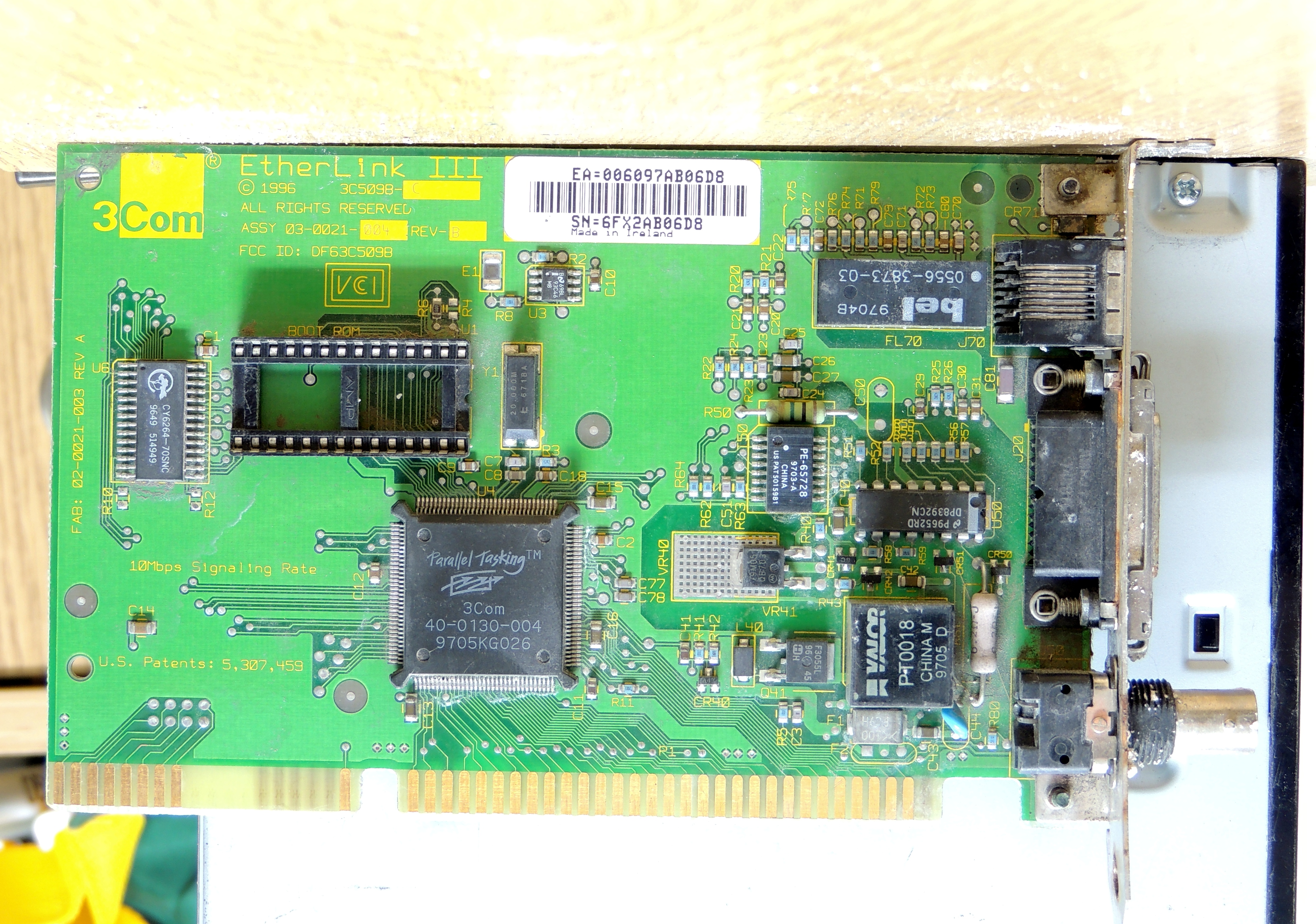
3C509B-Combo 1996 ASSY 03-0021-004 REV-B

Label:

 Etherlink III
(C) 1994 3C509B-C
 ALL RIGHTS RESERVED
 ASSY 03-0021-001 REV-A
 FCC ID: DF63C509B

Barcode:

 EA=0020AFDCC34C
 SN=6AHDCC34C
 MADE IN U.S.A.

R = Resistor C = Capacitor L = Inductance Q = Transistor CR = Transistor FL = Transformer T = Transformer U = Integrated circuit J = Jumper or connector VR F

FL70: Pulse transformer

 bel9509 A
 0556-3873-03
 * HIPOTTED

Y1: 20 MHz crystal

 20.000M
    652DA

U50:

 P9512BR
 DP8392CN
 Coaxial Transceiver Interface

T50: Pulse transformer, pinout: 2x8

 VALOR
 ST7033

x00: Pulse transformer

 VALOR
  PT0018
  CHINA M
  9449 C

U4: Plastic package 33x33 pins

 Parallel Tasking TM
 3Com
 40-0130-002
 9513S 22050553
 AT&T 40-01302

Another chip with the same function:

 40-0130-003
 9545S 48324401
 AT&T 40-01303

U6: 8192 x 8-bit 70 ns CMOS static RAM

 HY 6264A
 LJ-70
 9509B KOREA

Another chip with the same function:

 CY6264-70OSC (photo)

U1: Boot ROM

 DIP-28 EPROM
 8, 16, or 32 KB (27/28C256) for boot code.

U3: 256 Bit/1K 5.0V CMOS Serial EEPROM

 B 52AH
  93C46
  M8

Q41: N-Channel Logic level Power MOSFET 60V, 11A, 107 mΩ (using ASSY 03-0021-004 due to obscured view)

 F3055L
 96   45
(H)H

VR41: 3-Terminal 0.5 A Negative Voltage Regulator (-5V) in D2PAK

 KA79
 M05

ASSY 03-0021-004 REV-B has written on it: U.S. Patents: U.S. patent 5,307,459

Connector for the computer bus: ISA 16-bit

Connections for networking: 10BASE-T (8P8C), AUI (DA-15), 10BASE2 (BNC)

== Driver setup ==
Some of the possible ISA I/O bases are 0x280, 0x300, 0x310, 0x320, 0x330, 0x340, 0x350. And IRQ 5, 7, 9, 10, 11, 12. The driver for OpenBSD, NetBSD and FreeBSD is "ep"; for Linux it is "lance".

== Patents ==
3c509B-C from 1996 specify the use of U.S. patent 5,307,459 with a priority date of 1992-07-28.

The patent describes a method where a data transfer counter triggers a threshold logic that generates an early indication or interrupt signal before the transfer is completed. The adapter also writes timing information into status registers such that a device driver can optimize for any latency.

== Uses ==
- PC/TCP Packet Driver for use with MS-DOS or PC DOS on X86
- Amiga networking (Miami Network Interface MNI, gg2-3c509.mni)

== See also ==
- AMD Lance Am7990 - 1985, AMD Am7990 network chip
- NE2000 - 1987, Novell's NE2000 network card
- RTL8139 - 1999, Realtek 8139 PCI network chip
