= Amiga emulation =

Amiga emulation refers to the activity of emulating a Commodore Amiga computer system using another computer platform. Most emulators run on modern systems such as Microsoft Windows or Macintosh. This allows Amiga users to use their existing software, and in some cases hardware, on modern computers.

Attempts have also been made to create a hardware Amiga emulator on FPGA chips (Minimig).

One of the most challenging aspects of emulating the Amiga architecture is the custom chipset which relies on critical cycle-exact emulation. As a result, early emulators did not always achieve the intended results; later emulator versions can accurately reproduce the behavior of Amiga systems.

== Emulators ==
Amiga version of Phantasie III running in WinUAE. The emulator's simulated power LED is in the lower right corner.

=== Fellow ===
An actively developed emulator capable of emulating all the common Amiga configurations. (A500, A600, etc...)

=== UAE ===
Although the name varies, this emulator exists for Windows, Macintosh, RISC OS, Linux, Unix and other systems, including the Amiga itself. It is capable of emulating a 68K Amiga, including undocumented behavior, with OCS and/or AGA chipsets and modern graphics and audio subsystems, including true colour graphic libraries and Amiga AHI 16 bit audio subsystem.

=== Denise ===
Originally designed as C64 emulator, the freeware Denise (version 2.0 and higher) can also emulate an Amiga 500 and an Amiga 1000 (for this, it needs the Kickstart versions 1.3 and 2.04 as .rom files). ( https://sourceforge.net/projects/deniseemu/ )

=== Commodore PET ===
The Commodore PET, introduced in July 2015, was an Android smartphone with Commodore 64 and Amiga emulation built-in.

== Legality ==
Amiga emulation software is legal by itself. However, a copy of a Kickstart ROM from a real Amiga is required for legal use, which is still protected under copyright laws. The Workbench software and many other programs and games are also copyrighted and illegal to download, although there are a number of recognized sites which offer free legal downloads of Amiga games. The Amiga Forever emulation package offers legal copies of Kickstart, Workbench and various games.

Another legal option for Amiga emulation is the AROS Research Operating System, which is available as free software. An AROS boot ROM can be used instead of Kickstart, which allows booting the m68k port of AROS from a floppy or CD image.

== See also ==
- Amiga Forever
