= Amiga Forever =

Amiga preservation, emulation and support package published by Cloanto

- Amiga Forever 2008 on Windows Vista.
- Developer: Cloanto IT srl
- Release: November 14, 1997; 28 years ago
- Stable release: July 3, 2025; 15 months ago - 11
- Operating system: Windows, macOS, Linux
- License: Proprietary
- Website: www.amigaforever.com

Amiga Forever is an Amiga preservation, emulation and support package allowing Amiga software to run on non-Amiga hardware legally without complex configuration. It is published by Cloanto,

The Windows version of Amiga Forever includes a "player" software developed by Cloanto which uses plugins such as WinUAE as emulation engines, while relying on its own user interface for configuration and authoring. In addition to supporting common disk image formats, Amiga Forever can also play back .Author files in Cloanto's proprietary RP9 format, which are compressed files, embed all media images including XML-based configuration and description data, and ancillary content like documentation, screenshots, and audio tracks.

Beginning from the 2012 version, Amiga Forever ships with an RP9 Editor for content authoring. Besides its own authoring and playback environment and Cloanto's floppy disk conversion service, Amiga Forever includes WinUAE and WinFellow, and different versions of UAE and E-UAE for other platforms. All versions of Amiga Forever include different AmigaOS (m68k) environments and support to run a large range of Amiga games and demoscene productions which are available for download from different software publishers and Amiga history sites. The Windows version also includes Cloanto's Amiga Explorer networking software, which allows access to Amiga resources (including virtual floppy, hard disk and ROM image files) from the Windows Desktop.

== History ==
Amiga International, the then owner of the intellectual property rights to the AmigaOS, sought to protect its property from people distributing unauthorized copies of the ROM files required for emulating Amiga software over the Internet. On October 7, 1997, it announced on its website that it had granted Cloanto, publisher of Amiga productivity applications, the rights to publish an Amiga emulator containing the AmigaOS software. The first version of Amiga Forever was released on November 14, 1997, after its debut at the Computer '97 show in Cologne, Germany. It was contained on a CD-ROM which contained a front-end for Windows and different versions of UAE for Windows, MS-DOS, Classic Mac OS, and Linux, plus Fellow for DOS and a selection of Amiga Kickstart ROM images and Workbench disks. The new plugin-based player software was introduced in 2007.

Amiga Forever was ported to Android and appeared as a Google Chrome extension, both in 2013 as Amiga Forever essentials. In both cases, the application provides the necessary ROM files for emulators designed for Android and Google Chrome respectively.

Amiga Forever required Cloanto to license the code from its owners Amiga, Inc. In 2012, Cloanto acquired the codes and copyrights of AmigaOS (up to versions 3.x) from Amiga, Inc. therefore no longer requiring to be a licensee for the code. In 2019, C-A Acquisition Corp (a company set up by Cloanto's owner) also acquired the Amiga name and trademarks from Amiga, Inc., allowing Cloanto to freely use and market the Amiga name.

== Features ==
The Player in Amiga Forever 2008

Amiga Forever comes bundled with all versions of the official Amiga ROM and OS files, from versions 0.7 to 3.1. It is also bundled with two preconfigured free and open source emulators: UAE and Fellow.

The Amiga Explorer is a networking framework that facilitates data sharing between a PC and an actual Amiga computer. It readily converts files stored on Amiga disk files into the Amiga Disk File format, and also allows PC users to mount drives on an Amiga machine, both for PC use.

Other features include:

- Emulation of Amiga hardware (allows Amiga software to run on a PC or mobile device)
- Additional emulation and drivers (RTG graphics, SCSI, TCP/IP, AHI, CDTV, CD^{32}, etc.)
- Amiga Forever player software for Windows to access and launch content
- Preinstalled games, demos and applications (web browser, paint, etc.)
- Support for a large amount of downloadable Amiga games, demos and applications
- Optional Live CD, based on Knoppix Light (boots a PC or Intel Mac directly into Workbench)
- More than five hours of Amiga videos (two DVDs)
- Gallery of items of historical interest.

== See also ==
- Minimig
- AmiKit
- UAE
