= DPAK =

DPAK may refer to:

- Democratic Patriotic Alliance of Kurdistan
- TO-252, also known as DPAK, a semiconductor package
- David Pakman, an Argentine-American leftist political commentator
