= Voyager (web browser) =

Discontinued web browser for Amiga computers

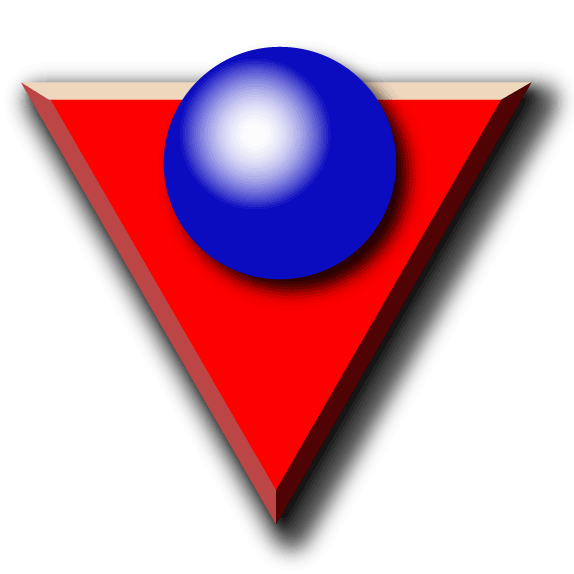
- Developer: VaporWare
- Stable release: 3.3.125 / April 16, 2000; 26 years ago
- Preview release: 3.3.126 / December 23, 2002; 23 years ago
- Operating system: AmigaOS, MorphOS
- Platform: Amiga
- Type: Web browser
- License: GPL since 2017
- Website: zapek.com/software/voyager/
- Repository: github.com/zapek/Voyager

Voyager is a discontinued web browser for the Amiga range of computers, developed by VaporWare.

Voyager supports HTML 3.2 and some HTML 4, JavaScript, frames, SSL, Flash, and various other Internet Explorer and Netscape Navigator features.

Voyager is also available for the MorphOS and CaOS operating systems.

== Voyager 3 ==
In May 1999 Oliver Wagner of VaporWare gave details of the upcoming Voyager 3 to Amiga Format, with planned new features including support for JavaScript, DOM (based on Internet Explorer's model), and CSS.

Voyager 3 was generally well-received, with Amiga Format praising its fast JavaScript execution and rapid table layout, but criticising its 'virtually unusable' print function and out-of-date documentation.

== See also ==
- AMosaic
- AWeb
- IBrowse
- OWB
