= Fellow (emulator) =

Fellow is an emulator designed to run software written for the Amiga computer platform. Released under the GNU General Public License, Fellow is free software.

Fellow was released shortly after the first usable release of the Unix Amiga Emulator (UAE). The competition between the two projects proved to be mutually beneficial. Originally, Fellow ran under DOS, but was ported to Microsoft Windows (WinFellow) and Linux (XFellow.) Development on WinFellow ceased in 2005, but was revived with a new release in 2010 to improve compatibility with Windows 7 and Windows Vista. Development on XFellow has apparently halted after a release in 2003 (based on timestamps inside the archive).

According to its author, Petter Schau, one of the main objectives in writing Fellow was to create an Amiga emulator that could run demos from the 1980s Amiga demoscene at full speed. Schau believed that Fellow and UAE belonged to a class of first-generation Amiga emulators, and that more accurate, full-speed emulators would be available in the future. As computing power increased, full-speed performance became achievable. Once more powerful computers were available, UAE became preferable due to its more accurate emulation, whereas Fellow remains popular for older hardware.

== See also ==
- Amiga emulation
