= Tlen.pl =

- Developer: Grupa o2 Sp. z o.o.
- Initial release: October 2001
- Stable release: 6.00.3.77 / January 16, 2009; 16 years ago (Windows)
- Preview release: 7.0.1.72 / February 10, 2011; 14 years ago (Windows, Linux, Mac OS X)
- Operating system: Microsoft Windows, Linux, Mac OS X
- Available in: Polish
- Type: Instant messaging client
- License: Freeware/Adware
- Website: www.tlen.pl

Tlen.pl was an adware licensed Polish instant messaging service. It was fully compatible with the main Polish Gadu-Gadu instant messenger. It was launched in 2001 and discontinued in May 2016.

The communication protocol is based on open-source jabberd code, but it was modified significantly, making it incompatible with generic XMPP clients and servers. Among other features, Tlen.pl allows for voice chats, SMS sending and video conferences. The versions later than 4.0 allow for creation and usage of plugins. Since then more than 130 plugins have been created by the community. By April 2008 there were more than 1 500 000 registered users and 780 000 real users of Tlen.pl.

Tlen is also integrated with the o2.pl mail system, which allows users to use mail in three domains: o2.pl; go2.pl and Tlen.pl. It is possible to easily access the mail system from the application. Tlen.pl automatically checks the user's account and if there is any new mail, it displays a notification on their screen.

It is also possible to connect to Tlen.pl from the Tlen.pl homepage with a browser.

Since version 6.0.1.7, Tlen has included the Tlenofon plugin, which enables VoIP functionality for the client. Tlenofon is similar to the Skype service and offers low-priced calls to Poland and other countries.

In the second half of 2009, Tlen 7 Beta was published. There were no longer any advertisements. The popularity of the service has been declining, however. The software has not been updated since 2011, and the server has been shut down on 10 May 2016.

== See also ==
- Comparison of instant messaging clients
