= AWeb =

Web browser for Amiga computers

- Initial release: 1996; 29 years ago
- Stable release: 3.4 / November 17, 2003; 21 years ago
- Preview release: 3.5.09 Beta / July 23, 2007; 17 years ago
- Repository: www.yvonrozijn.nl/aweb/index.html
- Written in: C
- Operating system: AmigaOS, MorphOS
- Platform: Amiga
- Type: Web Browser
- License: AWeb Public License (Open source)
- Website: www.greyhound-data.com/gunnar/aweb/

AWeb is a web browser for the Amiga range of computers. Originally developed by Yvon Rozijn, AWeb was shipped with version 3.9 of AmigaOS, and is now open source.

AWeb supports HTML 3.2, and some 4.01, JavaScript, frames, SSL, and various other Netscape and Internet Explorer features.

== Awards/Press ==
I like the speed of "AWeb". - The program received a rating of 89% and the "recommendation of the editors" award in our October 96 issue of "Amiga Plus"

— Hartmut Schumacher, "Amiga Plus" magazine

- Amiga Computing, December 96 issue, Overall rating of 89%.
- Amiga User International, January 97 issue, rating of 95%.
- CU Amiga, November 1996 issue, rating of 91%.

== See also ==
- AMosaic
- IBrowse
- Voyager
