= NE1000 =

Early line of low-cost Ethernet network cards

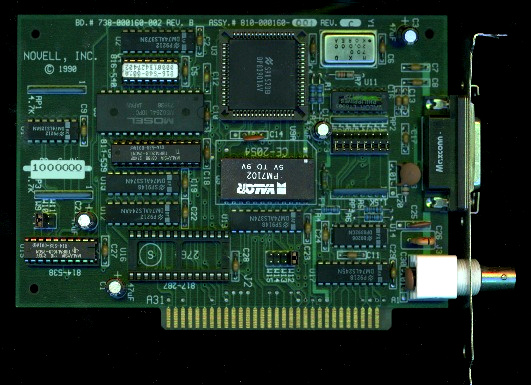
NE1000 8-bit ISA card (rev B, added AUI port for transceiver)

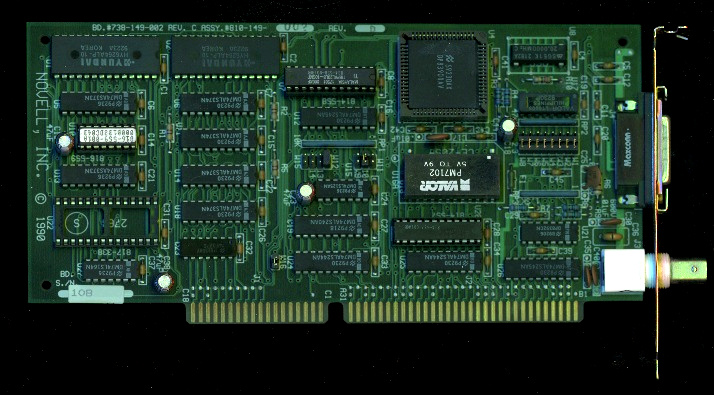
NE2000 16-bit ISA card (rev B, added AUI port for transceiver)

The NE1000 and NE2000 are members of an early line of low cost Ethernet network cards introduced by Novell in 1987. Their popularity had a significant impact on the pervasiveness of networks in computing. They are based on a reference design from National Semiconductor using their 8390 Ethernet chip.

== History ==
In the late 1980s, Novell was looking to shed its hardware server business and transform its flagship NetWare product into a PC-based server operating system that was agnostic and independent of the physical network implementation and topology (Novell even referred to NetWare as a NOS, or network operating system). To do this, Novell needed networking technology in general — and networking cards in particular — to become a commodity, so that the server operating system and protocols would become the differentiating technology.

Most of the key pieces of this strategy were already in place: Ethernet and Token Ring (among others) had been codified by the IEEE 802 standards committee — the draft was not formally adopted until 1990, but was already in widespread use, and cards from one vendor were, on the whole, wire-compatible with cards complying with the same 802 working group. However, networking hardware vendors in general, and industry leaders 3Com and IBM in particular, were charging high prices for their hardware.

To combat this, Novell decided to develop its own line of cards. In order to create these at minimal R&D, engineering and production costs, Novell based their board on the DP839EB, a reference design created by National Semiconductor using the 8390 Ethernet chip. Compared to the reference design's direct memory access, Novell used Programmed I/O, which limited performance. Novell's design also didn't map the card's internal buffer RAM into the host's address space.

The original card, the NE1000 (8-bit ISA; announced as "E-Net adapter" in February 1987 for 495 USD) The "NE" prefix stood for "Novell Ethernet".

=== NE2000 ===
The NE2000, using the 16-bit ISA bus of the PC AT followed in 1988. It uses thin Ethernet; the second ("B") revision added an Attachment Unit Interface (AUI) port to support a transceiver, and later models NE1000T and NE2000T added built-in 10BASE-T support.

With the launch of the NE1000 and NE2000, Novell took two significant steps.

The first was a program under which other vendors were invited to manufacture the cards with no royalty as "NE1000-compatible" cards. Vendors were required to submit their cards to Novell for certification, which focused on whether the standard Novell driver worked with the card. Interested manufacturers were given a complete package of manufacturing documentation to allow them to start building NE1000/2000 compatible cards without having to do any design work. The primary intent of this program was to drive down the cost of network hardware to promote the adoption of PC networking.

The second innovation taken, primarily to deal with internal management issues, was to allow Novell's distributors to buy the cards directly from its manufacturer, Eagle, a contract manufacturing subsidiary of Anthem Technologies, the industrial distributor that provided the components for the NE1000/2000. Novell received a royalty on each card, but was no longer involved in scheduling and ordering manufacturing.

In order to remain competitive with Novell's bargain-price cards, 3Com and other vendors were forced to cut the pricing of their entry-level network cards, contributing greatly to the networking boom of the 1990s. To a lesser extent, it is arguable that the success of the NE1000/2000 cards helped to tip the scales of the "LAN wars" in favor of Ethernet (championed by 3Com) over Token Ring (championed by IBM), though its main impact was to significantly lower the cost of PC networks.

In 2003 National Semiconductor ceased manufacturing the 8390 chip.

== Clones ==
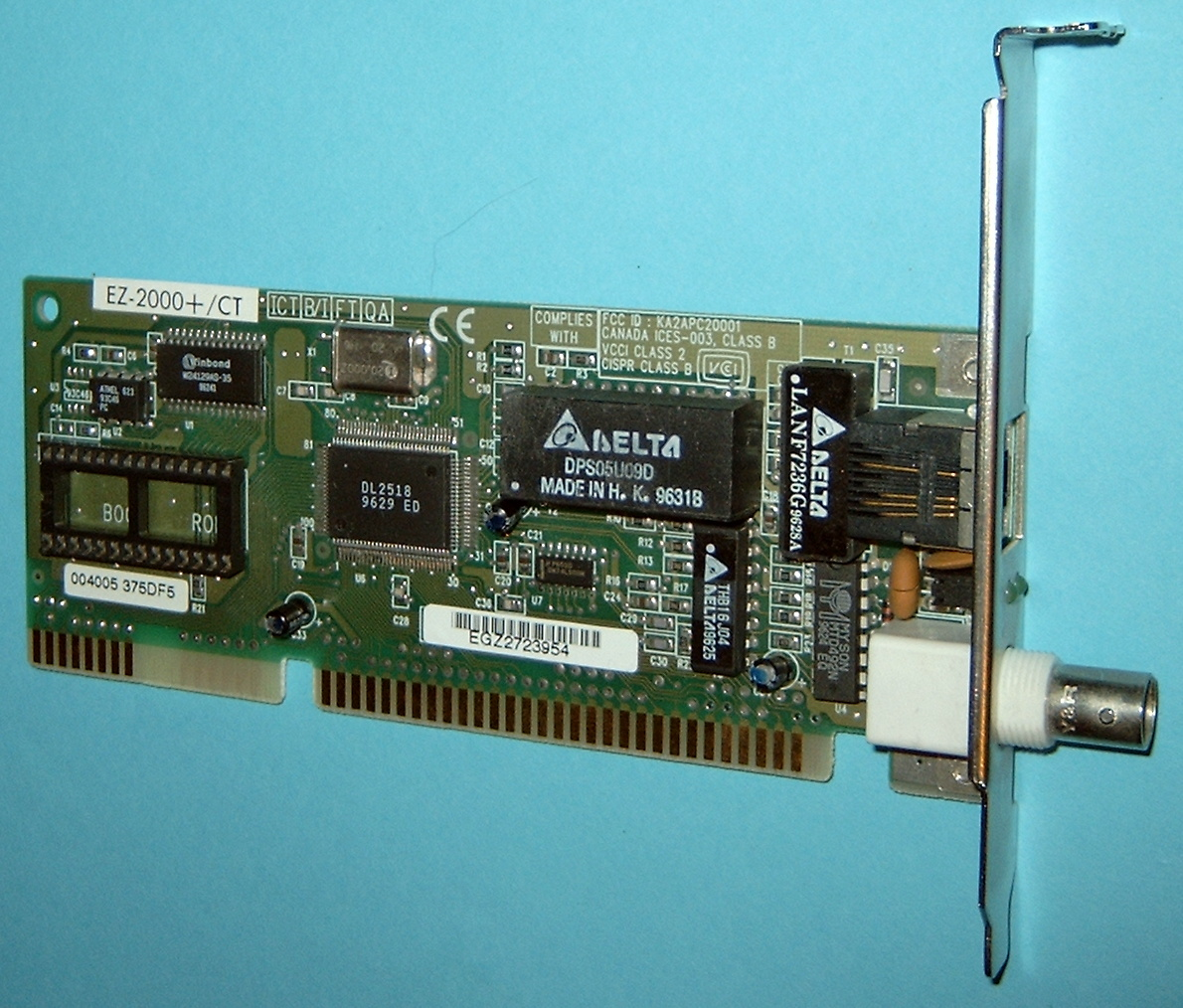
NE2000 compatible 10 Mbit/s ISA 16-bit PnP card

Many other manufacturers copied the design labeling under their own brand, while still claiming NE1000/NE2000 compatibility. However, in reality, this was not always the case. For instance, the Winbond 83C901 ignores the reset signal.

== Supported operating systems ==
Besides NetWare, driver support is available for MS-DOS, Windows, UNIX, FreeBSD, QNX, and Linux. Windows XP does not support non-Plug and Play versions and Windows Vista does not support the NE2000 at all. Windows 2000 appears to have a working driver.

== Emulator support ==
- DOSBox, via third-party patches
- Kernel-based Virtual Machine (KVM)
- Bochs
- PCem, since v13
- 86Box

== See also ==
- AMD Lance Am7990 - 1985, AMD Am7990 network chip
- 3Com 3c509 - 1994, 3Com 3c509 network card
- RTL8139 - 1997-2005, Realtek 8139 PCI network chips family
