= TO-263 =

Surface mount power semiconductor package

TO-263AA front view

TO-263AA back view

3D model of TO-263AA package

The Double Decawatt Package, D2PAK, SOT404 or DDPAK, standardized as TO-263, is a semiconductor package type intended for surface mounting on circuit boards. The TO-263 is designed by Motorola. They are similar to the earlier TO-220-style packages intended for high power dissipation but lack the extended metal tab and mounting hole, while representing a larger version of the TO-252, also known as DPAK, SMT package. As with all SMT packages, the pins on a D2PAK are bent to lie against the PCB surface. The TO-263 can have 3 to 7 terminals.

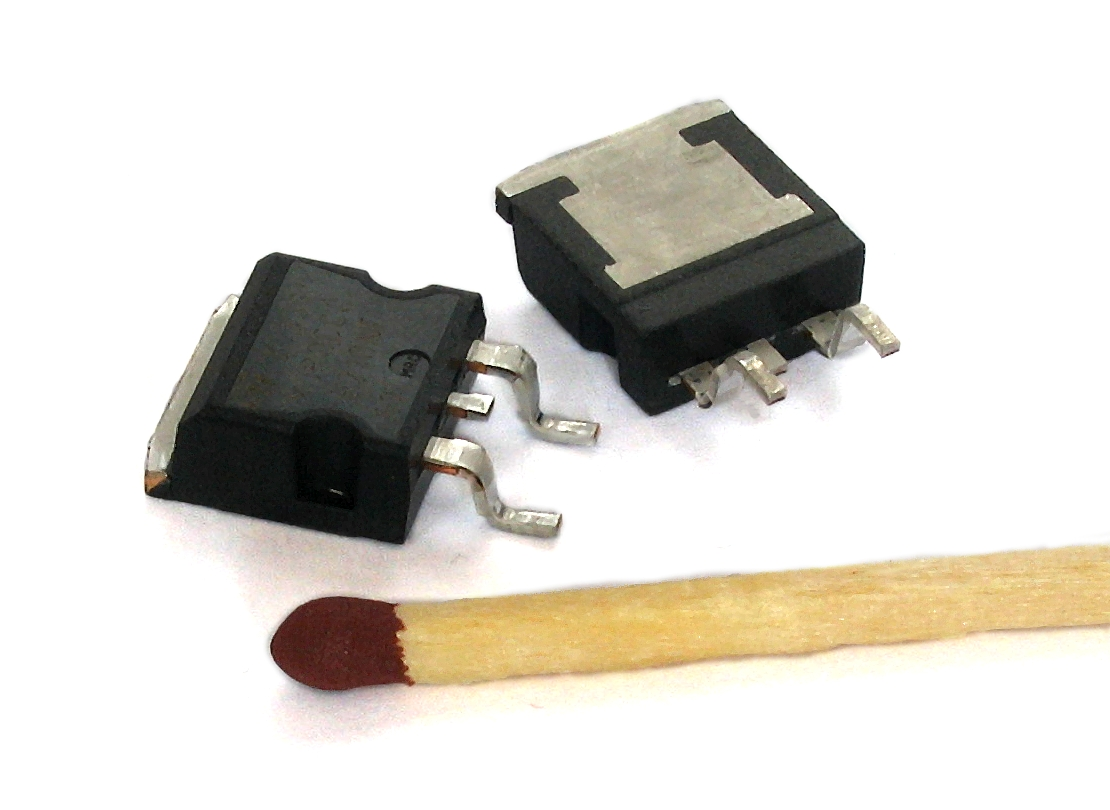
A pair of MOSFETs in the surface-mount package D2PAK.

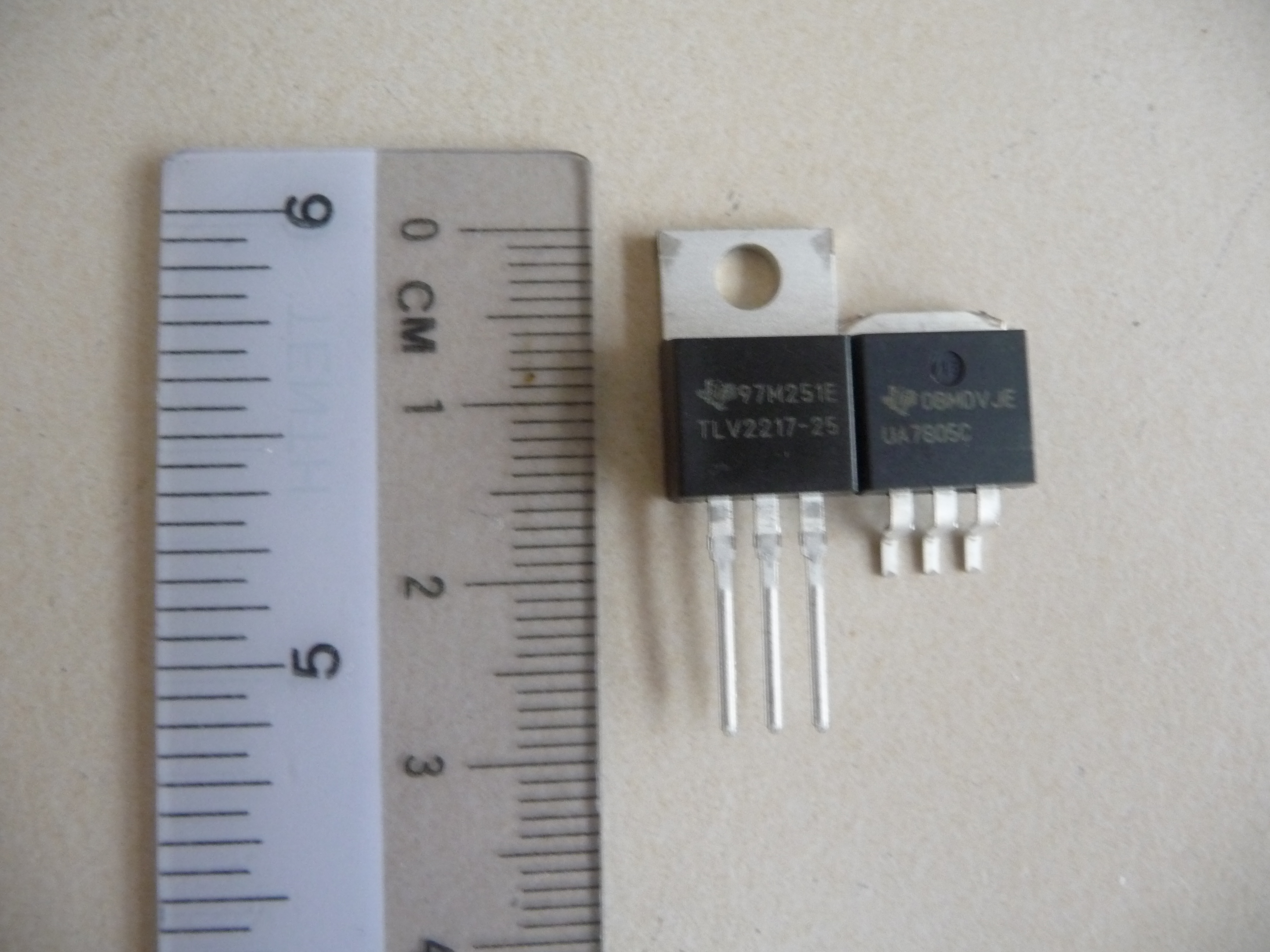
A TO-220 package compared to a D2PAK package.

== Dimensions ==
Dimensions of the TO-263-3 (TO-263AA) package in mm.

== Variants ==
Texas instruments has a smaller version of the TO-263: the TO-263 THIN. The height of the TO-263 THIN is 2 mm instead of the standard 4.5 mm.

== See also ==
- TO-220, through hole version of the TO-263
