= Directory Opus =

File managing software

- Original author: Jonathan Potter
- Developer: GPSoftware
- Release: January 1990; 36 years ago
- Stable release: 13.25 / 21 August 2026; 2 months ago
- Operating system: AmigaOS, Microsoft Windows
- Type: File manager
- License: Proprietary
- Website: www.gpsoft.com.au

Directory Opus (or "DOpus" as its users tend to call it) is a file manager program, originally written for the Amiga computer system in the early to mid-1990s. Commercial development on the version for the Amiga ceased in 1997. Directory Opus is still being actively developed and sold for the Microsoft Windows operating system by GPSoftware and there are open source releases of Directory Opus 4 and 5 for Amiga.

Directory Opus was originally developed by, and is still written by, Australian Jonathan Potter. Until 1994, it was published by well-known Amiga software company Inovatronics, when Potter joined with Greg Perry and the Australian-based GPSoftware to continue its development, and has since been published by GPSoftware.

== Features ==
Directory Opus has evolved since its first release in 1990 as a basic two-panel file manager. The interface has evolved significantly due to feedback given by its users. Some of the features include:

- Single or dual-panel exploring.
- Folder tree (either shared or separate for dual-display).
- Tabbed explorer panels.
- Ability to maintain date created/modified timestamps for both files and folders.
- Internal handling of ZIP, RAR, 7Zip and other archive formats (browse them like folders).
- Internal FTP handling, including (for a small extra fee) advanced FTP and SSH (browse these like folders also).
- Internal MTP handling for portable devices like phones and cameras.
- Flat-file display, where you can flatten a folder tree and even hide the folders themselves.
- Powerful file selection and renaming tools, with advanced regex.
- User-definable toolbars, menus, filetypes and filetype groups.
- Preview panel, with preview of thumbnails (including animated avi thumbnails).
- File collections. These are like virtual folders that contain links to the original files (unlike shortcuts, these actually deal with the files directly).

== History ==
=== Release history ===
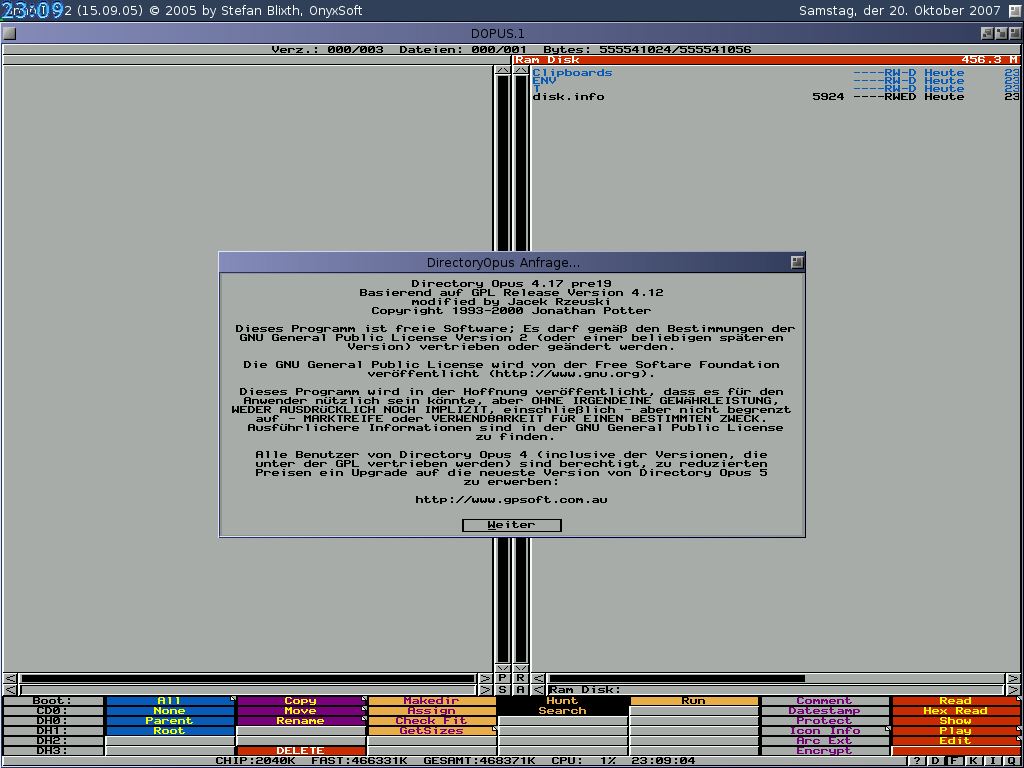
Version 4.17 (GPL release): design circa 1992

Version 8: design circa 2004

==== Amiga release history ====
- Opus 1: January 1990
- Opus 2: February 1991
- Opus 3: 1991-12-01
- Opus 4: 1992-12-04
- Opus 5: 1995-04-12
- Opus 5.5: 1996-08-01
- Opus Magellan (5.6): 1997-05-17
- Opus Magellan II (5.8): 1998-11-01
- Opus Magellan II GPL (5.90): 2014-05-11

Versions 1 and 2 were only available direct from the author. Versions 3 and 4 were published by Inovatronics. Versions since 5 have been published by GPSoftware (German versions were published by Stefan Ossowskis Schatztruhe). The full version of Magellan II is included for free with AmiKit package.

==== Windows major release history ====
- Opus 6: 2001-06-18
- Opus 8: 2004-10-04
- Opus 9: 2007-04-27
- Opus 10: 2011-04-30
- Opus 11: 2014-03-03
- Opus 12: 2016-09-05
- Opus 13: 2024-01-23

All Windows versions published by GPSoftware. (German versions published by supporters of the German Forum.)

==== Open source release history ====
- GPSoftware released the older Amiga Directory Opus 4 source code in 2000 as open-source under the GNU General Public License. AmigaOS4, AROS and MorphOS ports of this version were made available. Magellan II was released as open source under the AROS Public License in December 2012.

The open source Worker (file manager) is heavily inspired by the Directory Opus 4 series.

== See also ==
- Comparison of file managers
