= TO-252 =

Semiconductor package for surface mounting on circuit boards

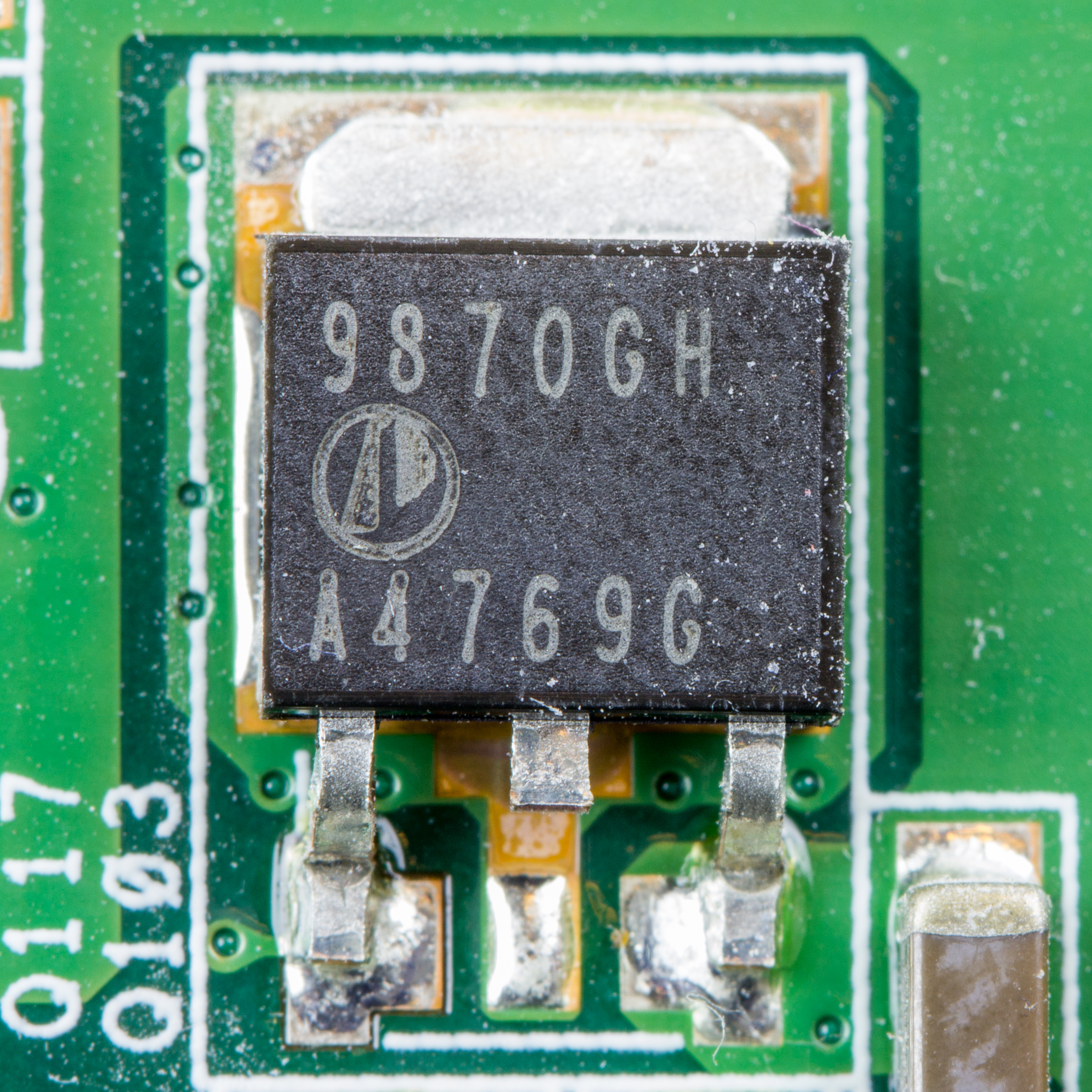
Power MOSFET (Advanced Power Electronics AP9870GH)

TO-252, also known as DPAK or Decawatt Package, is a semiconductor package developed by Motorola for surface mounting on circuit boards. It represents a surface-mount variant of TO-251 package, and smaller variant of the D2PAK package. It is often used for high-power MOSFETs and voltage regulators.

== Variants ==
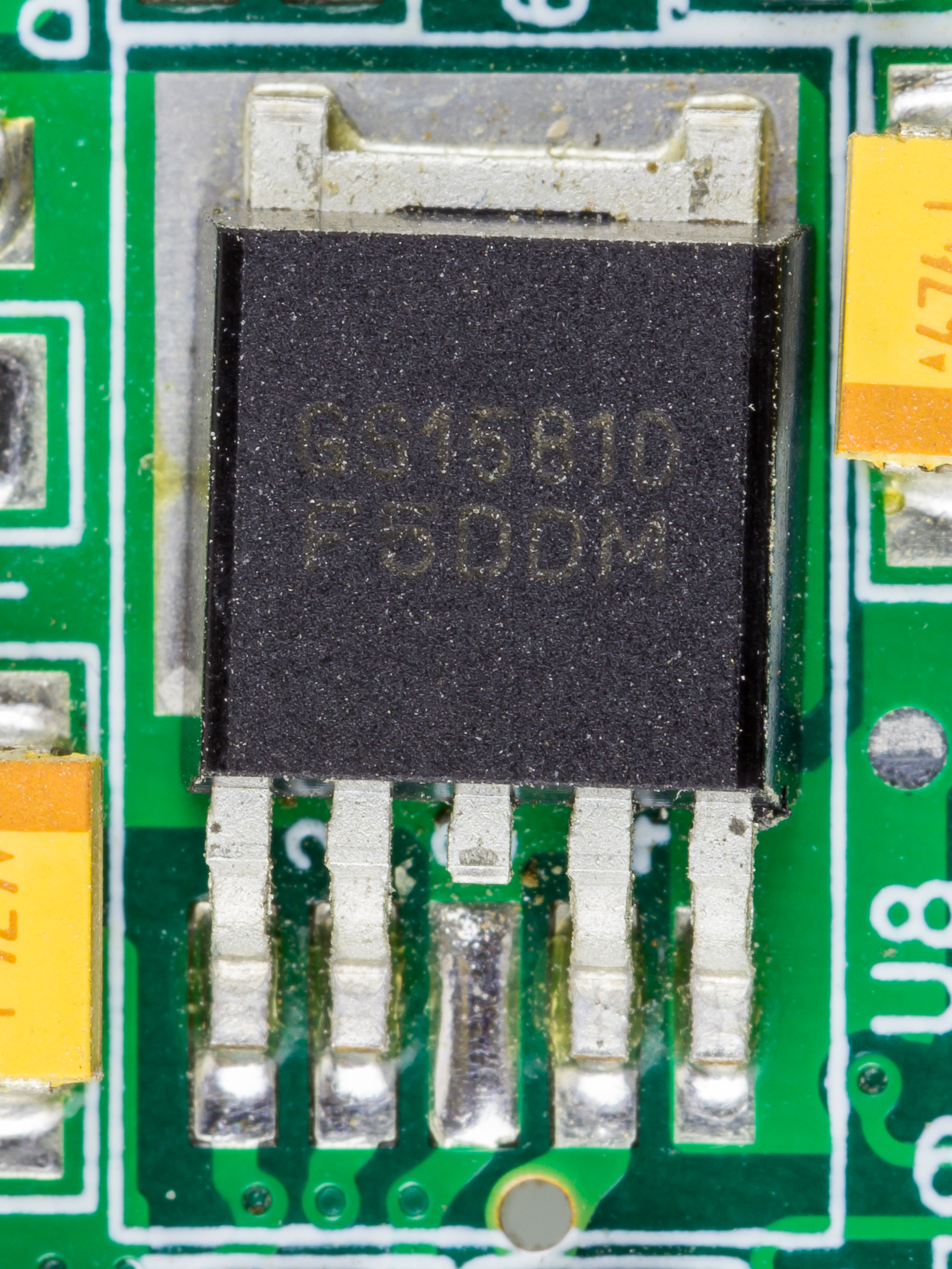
Variant with 5 pins: a dual input dropout regulator (Globaltech GS1581D)

Package can have 3 pins with 90 mils (2.3 mm) pitch or 5 pins with 45 mils (1.1 mm) pitch. The middle pin is usually connected to the tab. The middle pin is sometimes omitted.

== See also ==
- TO-263
