= Rashumon =

Multilingual graphical word processor

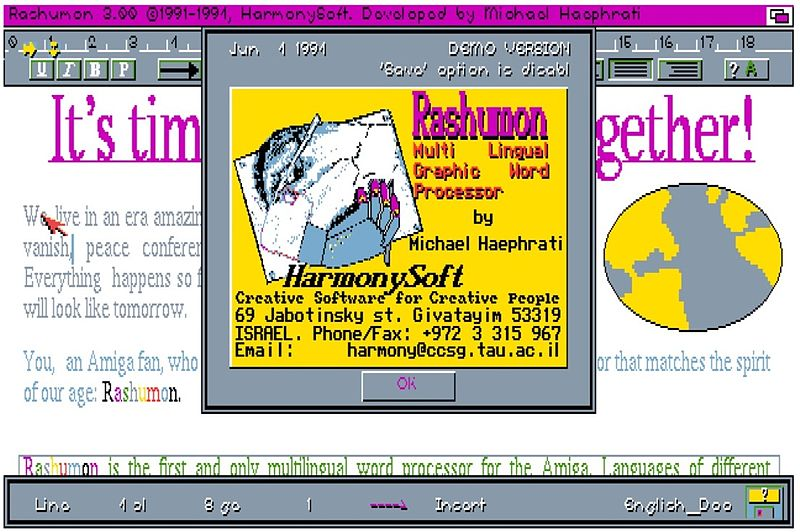
- Original author: HarmonySoft
- Release: 1989; 37 years ago
- Stable release: "student" version / 1995; 31 years ago
- Operating system: Amiga OS
- Platform: Amiga
- Type: Word processor
- Website: http://www.rashumon.com/

Rashumon was a multilingual graphical word processor developed for the Amiga computer by an Israel-based company called HarmonySoft (founded by Michael Haephrati in 1989) and was sold until after the demise of Commodore in 1994 (a lower-priced "student" version was released in 1995). Rashumon had particular support for Hebrew, Arabic and Russian as well as English, and it could send its text to speech synthesis in English.

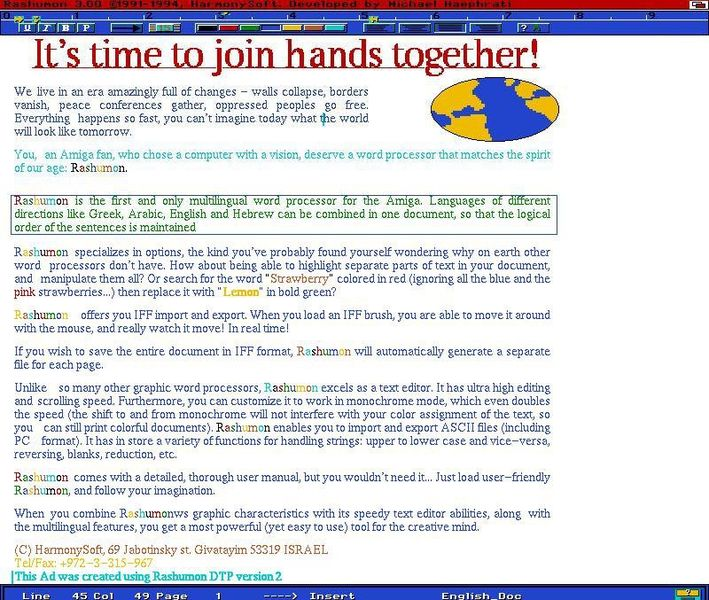
Print sample created by Rashumon (an advertisement in the spirit of the Revolutions of 1989)

Rashumon's Table Generator

The ruler used to allow bi-directional text editing

Rashumon was the only word processor for the Amiga having the ability to create and edit multilingual documents. Rashumon printed using Type 1 PostScript fonts and it also supported Intellifont.

== Name ==
Rashumon was named after a Japanese movie which had four different characters giving different versions of the same event. Amiga User International commented that this name seemed appropriate for a wordprocessor designed to support multiple languages.

== Notable features ==
- Discontinuous selections: the user can select multiple parts of the text—even if these parts are separated from each other—and perform clipboard manipulations on them (e.g. selecting the first paragraph and the last paragraph of a document at the same time, and copying both of them to the clipboard).
- A Table generator, allowing the creation and editing of tables.
- Multiple key map support, up to five simultaneously, allowing for the use of multiple languages simultaneously.
- Search and replace including color, style and font filters. For example, end users could search for the word "Apple" only in green (ignoring this word in other colors) and replace each occurrence with the word "Banana" in yellow.
- Multilingual string gadgets (the Amiga equivalent to text boxes) for creating and renaming files, drawers, etc.
- Import and export multilingual ASCII files to and from PC and Macintosh.
- Fast screen updating and scrolling.
- Interchange File Format (IFF) graphics support (import and export).
- Direct access to 255 characters of each font, similar to inserting "symbols" or "special characters" in modern wordprocessors.
