= AMosaic =

Web browser port for Amiga computers

- AMosaic 1.1 screenshot
- Developers: Michael Fischer, Michael Meyer, Michael Witbrock
- Release: December 25, 1993; 32 years ago
- Final release: 2.0 pre-release
- Written in: C
- Operating system: AmigaOS
- Platform: Amiga
- Type: Web browser
- Website: www.mfischer.com/legacy/amosaic/ at the Wayback Machine (archived 2020-01-05)

AMosaic was a port to the Amiga of the Mosaic web browser, developed beginning in 1993, and was the first graphical web browser for the Amiga. AMosaic was based on NCSA's Mosaic, but was not distributed by the University of Illinois or NCSA. It was developed by Michael Fischer at Stony Brook University, Michael Meyer at the University of California, Berkeley, and Michael Witbrock at Carnegie Mellon University.

== Amiga-only features ==
At the time of its launch, AMosaic offered several features beyond the capabilities of Mosaic, thanks to the unique capabilities of the AmigaOS and existing support libraries.

The Magic User Interface (MUI) system used to construct the user interface enabled user full user-customization of fonts, colors, and background patterns.

AMosaic makes use of AmigaOS Datatypes for its external and inline image decoding, making it simple for users to extend the list of supported image types by installing the appropriate operating system plugin.

An ARexx inter-application communication interface was built into AMosaic, allowing simple scripting and transferring of data between AMosaic and other software. Using ARexx, users can write external scripts to ask AMosaic to retrieve a page and return it in ASCII format, or AMosaic can execute a script calling an external bookmark tracking program.

Uses the networking software DNet, AmiTCP 3.0b2, or AS225r2.

== Publicity ==
AMosaic was featured as the cover story in the March, 1995 issue of Amiga World magazine.

The original developers, Michael Fischer, Michael Meyer, and Michael Witbrock, co-wrote User Extensibility in Amiga Mosaic, which was presented by Michael Witbrock at the Second International World Wide Web Conference in Chicago, Illinois, October 17–20, 1994.

== System requirements ==
- AmigaOS 2.0 or greater
- AmiTCP 3.0 beta 2 or AS225 Release 2, or DNET
- Magic User Interface (MUI) 3.8
- Workbench 3 users need the ZGIF DataType to decode inlined GIF images
