= Decimal64 floating-point format =

64-bit computer number format

In computing, decimal64 is a decimal floating-point computer number format that occupies 8 bytes (64 bits) in computer memory. The format was formally introduced in the 2008 revision of the IEEE 754 standard, also known as ISO/IEC/IEEE 60559:2011.

== Format ==
Decimal64 values are categorized as normal or subnormal (denormal) numbers and can be encoded in either binary integer decimal (BID) or densely packed decimal (DPD) formats. Normal values can possess 16-digit precision ranging from ±1.000000000000000×10^{−383} to ±9.999999999999999×10^{384}. In addition to normal and subnormal numbers, the format also includes signed zeros, infinities, and NaNs.

The binary format of identical size accommodates a spectrum from denormal-min ±5×10^{−324}, through normal-min with complete 53-bit precision ±2.2250738585072014×10^{−308}, to maximum ±1.7976931348623157×10^{+308}.

Because the significand for the IEEE 754, decimal formats are not normalized and most values with less than 16 significant digits have multiple possible representations; 1000000 × 10^{−2} = 100000 × 10^{−1} = 10000 × 10^{0} = 1000 × 10^{1} all have the value 10000. These sets of representations for the same value are called cohorts. The different members can be used to denote how many digits of the value are known precisely. Each signed zero has 768 possible representations (1536 for all zeros, in two different cohorts).

== Encoding of decimal64 values ==
Sign	Combination	Significand continuation
1 bit	13 bits	50 bits

IEEE 754 allows two alternative encodings for decimal64 values. The standard does not specify how to signify which representation is used. For instance, in a situation where decimal64 values are communicated between systems:

- In the binary encoding, the 16-digit significand is represented as a binary coded positive integer, based on binary integer decimal (BID).
- In the decimal encoding, the 16-digit significand is represented as a decimal coded positive integer, based on densely packed decimal (DPD) with 5 groups of 3 digits each represented in declets, 10-bit sequences. The most significant bit is encoded separately. This is efficient because 2^{10} = 1024, is only slightly more than needed to contain all integers from 0 to 999.

Both alternatives provide exactly the same set of representable numbers: 16 digits of significand and 3 × 2^{8} = 768 possible decimal exponent values. All the possible decimal exponent values storable in a binary64 number are representable in decimal64, and most bits of the significand of a binary64 are stored keeping roughly the same number of decimal digits in the significand.

In both cases, the most significant 4 bits of the significand, which only have 10 possible values, are combined with two bits of the exponent (3 possible values) to use 30 of the 32 possible values of a 5-bit field. The remaining combinations encode infinities and NaNs. BID and DPD use different bits of the combination field.

For Infinity and NaN, all other bits of the encoding are not used. Thus, an array can be filled with a single byte value to set it to Infinities or NaNs.

=== Binary integer significand field ===
This format uses a binary significand from 0 to 10^{16} − 1 = 9999999999999999 = 2386F26FC0FFFF_{16} = 100011100001101111001001101111110000001111111111111111_{2}.The encoding, completely stored on 64 bits, can represent binary significands up to 10 × 2^{50} − 1 = 11258999068426239 = 27FFFFFFFFFFFF_{16}, but values larger than 10^{16} − 1 are illegal and the standard requires implementations to treat them as 0 if encountered on input.

As described above, the encoding varies depending on whether the most significant 4 bits of the significand are in the range 0 to 7 (0000_{2} to 0111_{2}), or higher (1000_{2} or 1001_{2}).

If the two bits after the sign bit are "00", "01", or "10", then the exponent field consists of the 10 bits following the sign bit and the significand is the remaining 53 bits with an implicit leading 0 bit. This includes subnormal numbers where the leading significand digit is 0.

If the 2 bits after the sign bit are "11", then the 10-bit exponent field is shifted 2 bits to the right (after both the sign bit and the "11" bits thereafter) and the represented significand is in the remaining 51 bits. In this case there is an implicit (that is, not stored) leading 3-bit sequence "100" for the MSB bits of the true significand (in the remaining lower bits ttt...ttt of the significand, not all possible values are used).

BID Encoding
Combination Field													Exponent	Significand / Description
g12	g11	g10	g9	g8	g7	g6	g5	g4	g3	g2	g1	g0	Exponent	Significand / Description
combination field not starting with '11', bits ab = 00, 01 or 10
a	b	c	d	m	m	m	m	m	m	e	f	g	abcdmmmmmm	(0)efgtttttttttttttttttttttttttttttttttttttttttttttttttt Finite number with small first digit of significand (0 .. 7).
combination field starting with '11', but not 1111, bits ab = 11, bits cd = 00, 01 or 10
1	1	c	d	m	m	m	m	m	m	e	f	g	cdmmmmmmef	100gtttttttttttttttttttttttttttttttttttttttttttttttttt Finite number with big first digit of significand (8 or 9).
combination field starting with '1111', bits abcd = 1111
1	1	1	1	0										±Infinity
1	1	1	1	1	0									quiet NaN
1	1	1	1	1	1									signaling NaN (with payload in significand)

The leading bits of the significand field do not encode the most significant decimal digit; they are simply part of a larger pure-binary number. For example, a significand of 8000000000000000 is encoded as binary 011100011010111111010100100110001101000000000000000000_{2} with the leading 4 bits encoding 7; the first significand which requires a 54th bit is 2^{53} = 9007199254740992. The highest valid significant is 9999999999999999 whose binary encoding is (100)011100001101111001001101111110000001111111111111111_{2} (with the 3 most significant bits (100) not stored but implicit as shown above; and the next bit is always zero in valid encodings).

In the above cases, the value represented is

(−1)^{sign} × 10^{exponent−398} × significand

If the four bits after the sign bit are "1111" then the value is an infinity or a NaN, as described above:

0 11110 xx...x    +infinity
1 11110 xx...x    -infinity
x 11111 0x...x    a quiet NaN
x 11111 1x...x    a signalling NaN

=== Densely packed decimal significand field ===
In this version, the significand is stored as a series of decimal digits. The leading digit is between 0 and 9 (3 or 4 binary bits) and the rest of the significand uses the densely packed decimal (DPD) encoding.

The leading 2 bits of the exponent and the leading digit (3 or 4 bits) of the significand are combined into the five bits that follow the sign bit. The eight bits after that are the exponent continuation field, providing the less-significant bits of the exponent. The last 50 bits are the significand continuation field, consisting of five 10-bit declets. Each declet encodes three decimal digits using the DPD encoding.

If the initial two bits following the sign bit are "00", "01", or "10", they represent the leading bits of the exponent, whereas the subsequent three bits "cde" are regarded as the leading decimal digit (ranging from 0 to 7):

If the first two bits after the sign bit are "11", then the second 2-bits are the leading bits of the exponent, and the next bit "e" is prefixed with implicit bits "100" to form the leading decimal digit (8 or 9):

The remaining two combinations (11 110 and 11 111) of the 5-bit field after the sign bit are used to represent ±infinity and NaNs, respectively.

DPD Encoding
Combination Field													Exponent	Significand / Description
g12	g11	g10	g9	g8	g7	g6	g5	g4	g3	g2	g1	g0	Exponent	Significand / Description
combination field not starting with '11', bits ab = 00, 01 or 10
a	b	c	d	e	m	m	m	m	m	m	m	m	abmmmmmmmm	(0)cde tttttttttt tttttttttt tttttttttt tttttttttt tttttttttt Finite number with small first digit of significand (0 … 7).
combination field starting with '11', but not 1111, bits ab = 11, bits cd = 00, 01 or 10
1	1	c	d	e	m	m	m	m	m	m	m	m	cdmmmmmmmm	100e tttttttttt tttttttttt tttttttttt tttttttttt tttttttttt Finite number with big first digit of significand (8 or 9).
combination field starting with '1111', bits abcd = 1111
1	1	1	1	0										±Infinity
1	1	1	1	1	0									quiet NaN
1	1	1	1	1	1									signaling NaN (with payload in significand)

The DPD/3BCD transcoding for the declets is given by the following table. b9...b0 are the bits of the DPD, and d2...d0 are the three BCD digits.

Densely packed decimal encoding rules
DPD encoded value											Decimal digits					
Code space (1024 states)	b9	b8	b7	b6	b5	b4	b3	b2	b1	b0	d2	d1	d0	Values encoded	Description	Occurrences (1000 states)
50.0% (512 states)	a	b	c	d	e	f	0	g	h	i	0abc	0def	0ghi	(0–7) (0–7) (0–7)	3 small digits	51.2% (512 states)
37.5% (384 states)	a	b	c	d	e	f	1	0	0	i	0abc	0def	100i	(0–7) (0–7) (8–9)	2 small digits, 1 large digit	38.4% (384 states)
37.5% (384 states)	a	b	c	g	h	f	1	0	1	i	0abc	100f	0ghi	(0–7) (8–9) (0–7)	2 small digits, 1 large digit	38.4% (384 states)
37.5% (384 states)	g	h	c	d	e	f	1	1	0	i	100c	0def	0ghi	(8–9) (0–7) (0–7)	2 small digits, 1 large digit	38.4% (384 states)
9.375% (96 states)	g	h	c	0	0	f	1	1	1	i	100c	100f	0ghi	(8–9) (8–9) (0–7)	1 small digit, 2 large digits	9.6% (96 states)
9.375% (96 states)	d	e	c	0	1	f	1	1	1	i	100c	0def	100i	(8–9) (0–7) (8–9)	1 small digit, 2 large digits	9.6% (96 states)
9.375% (96 states)	a	b	c	1	0	f	1	1	1	i	0abc	100f	100i	(0–7) (8–9) (8–9)	1 small digit, 2 large digits	9.6% (96 states)
3.125% (32 states, 8 used)	x	x	c	1	1	f	1	1	1	i	100c	100f	100i	(8–9) (8–9) (8–9)	3 large digits, b9, b8: don't care	0.8% (8 states)

Representation of every number from 0 to 999
Representation	Bits	Value
0	0000000000	0
1	0000000001	1
2	0000000010	2
3	0000000011	3
4	0000000100	4
5	0000000101	5
6	0000000110	6
7	0000000111	7
8	0000001000	8
9	0000001001	9
16	0000010000	10
17	0000010001	11
18	0000010010	12
19	0000010011	13
20	0000010100	14
21	0000010101	15
22	0000010110	16
23	0000010111	17
24	0000011000	18
25	0000011001	19
32	0000100000	20
33	0000100001	21
34	0000100010	22
35	0000100011	23
36	0000100100	24
37	0000100101	25
38	0000100110	26
39	0000100111	27
40	0000101000	28
41	0000101001	29
48	0000110000	30
49	0000110001	31
50	0000110010	32
51	0000110011	33
52	0000110100	34
53	0000110101	35
54	0000110110	36
55	0000110111	37
56	0000111000	38
57	0000111001	39
64	0001000000	40
65	0001000001	41
66	0001000010	42
67	0001000011	43
68	0001000100	44
69	0001000101	45
70	0001000110	46
71	0001000111	47
72	0001001000	48
73	0001001001	49
80	0001010000	50
81	0001010001	51
82	0001010010	52
83	0001010011	53
84	0001010100	54
85	0001010101	55
86	0001010110	56
87	0001010111	57
88	0001011000	58
89	0001011001	59
96	0001100000	60
97	0001100001	61
98	0001100010	62
99	0001100011	63
100	0001100100	64
101	0001100101	65
102	0001100110	66
103	0001100111	67
104	0001101000	68
105	0001101001	69
112	0001110000	70
113	0001110001	71
114	0001110010	72
115	0001110011	73
116	0001110100	74
117	0001110101	75
118	0001110110	76
119	0001110111	77
120	0001111000	78
121	0001111001	79
10	0000001010	80
11	0000001011	81
42	0000101010	82
43	0000101011	83
74	0001001010	84
75	0001001011	85
106	0001101010	86
107	0001101011	87
46	0000101110	88
47	0000101111	89
26	0000011010	90
27	0000011011	91
58	0000111010	92
59	0000111011	93
90	0001011010	94
91	0001011011	95
122	0001111010	96
123	0001111011	97
62	0000111110	98
63	0000111111	99
128	0010000000	100
129	0010000001	101
130	0010000010	102
131	0010000011	103
132	0010000100	104
133	0010000101	105
134	0010000110	106
135	0010000111	107
136	0010001000	108
137	0010001001	109
144	0010010000	110
145	0010010001	111
146	0010010010	112
147	0010010011	113
148	0010010100	114
149	0010010101	115
150	0010010110	116
151	0010010111	117
152	0010011000	118
153	0010011001	119
160	0010100000	120
161	0010100001	121
162	0010100010	122
163	0010100011	123
164	0010100100	124
165	0010100101	125
166	0010100110	126
167	0010100111	127
168	0010101000	128
169	0010101001	129
176	0010110000	130
177	0010110001	131
178	0010110010	132
179	0010110011	133
180	0010110100	134
181	0010110101	135
182	0010110110	136
183	0010110111	137
184	0010111000	138
185	0010111001	139
192	0011000000	140
193	0011000001	141
194	0011000010	142
195	0011000011	143
196	0011000100	144
197	0011000101	145
198	0011000110	146
199	0011000111	147
200	0011001000	148
201	0011001001	149
208	0011010000	150
209	0011010001	151
210	0011010010	152
211	0011010011	153
212	0011010100	154
213	0011010101	155
214	0011010110	156
215	0011010111	157
216	0011011000	158
217	0011011001	159
224	0011100000	160
225	0011100001	161
226	0011100010	162
227	0011100011	163
228	0011100100	164
229	0011100101	165
230	0011100110	166
231	0011100111	167
232	0011101000	168
233	0011101001	169
240	0011110000	170
241	0011110001	171
242	0011110010	172
243	0011110011	173
244	0011110100	174
245	0011110101	175
246	0011110110	176
247	0011110111	177
248	0011111000	178
249	0011111001	179
138	0010001010	180
139	0010001011	181
170	0010101010	182
171	0010101011	183
202	0011001010	184
203	0011001011	185
234	0011101010	186
235	0011101011	187
174	0010101110	188
175	0010101111	189
154	0010011010	190
155	0010011011	191
186	0010111010	192
187	0010111011	193
218	0011011010	194
219	0011011011	195
250	0011111010	196
251	0011111011	197
190	0010111110	198
191	0010111111	199
256	0100000000	200
257	0100000001	201
258	0100000010	202
259	0100000011	203
260	0100000100	204
261	0100000101	205
262	0100000110	206
263	0100000111	207
264	0100001000	208
265	0100001001	209
272	0100010000	210
273	0100010001	211
274	0100010010	212
275	0100010011	213
276	0100010100	214
277	0100010101	215
278	0100010110	216
279	0100010111	217
280	0100011000	218
281	0100011001	219
288	0100100000	220
289	0100100001	221
290	0100100010	222
291	0100100011	223
292	0100100100	224
293	0100100101	225
294	0100100110	226
295	0100100111	227
296	0100101000	228
297	0100101001	229
304	0100110000	230
305	0100110001	231
306	0100110010	232
307	0100110011	233
308	0100110100	234
309	0100110101	235
310	0100110110	236
311	0100110111	237
312	0100111000	238
313	0100111001	239
320	0101000000	240
321	0101000001	241
322	0101000010	242
323	0101000011	243
324	0101000100	244
325	0101000101	245
326	0101000110	246
327	0101000111	247
328	0101001000	248
329	0101001001	249
336	0101010000	250
337	0101010001	251
338	0101010010	252
339	0101010011	253
340	0101010100	254
341	0101010101	255
342	0101010110	256
343	0101010111	257
344	0101011000	258
345	0101011001	259
352	0101100000	260
353	0101100001	261
354	0101100010	262
355	0101100011	263
356	0101100100	264
357	0101100101	265
358	0101100110	266
359	0101100111	267
360	0101101000	268
361	0101101001	269
368	0101110000	270
369	0101110001	271
370	0101110010	272
371	0101110011	273
372	0101110100	274
373	0101110101	275
374	0101110110	276
375	0101110111	277
376	0101111000	278
377	0101111001	279
266	0100001010	280
267	0100001011	281
298	0100101010	282
299	0100101011	283
330	0101001010	284
331	0101001011	285
362	0101101010	286
363	0101101011	287
302	0100101110	288
303	0100101111	289
282	0100011010	290
283	0100011011	291
314	0100111010	292
315	0100111011	293
346	0101011010	294
347	0101011011	295
378	0101111010	296
379	0101111011	297
318	0100111110	298
319	0100111111	299
384	0110000000	300
385	0110000001	301
386	0110000010	302
387	0110000011	303
388	0110000100	304
389	0110000101	305
390	0110000110	306
391	0110000111	307
392	0110001000	308
393	0110001001	309
400	0110010000	310
401	0110010001	311
402	0110010010	312
403	0110010011	313
404	0110010100	314
405	0110010101	315
406	0110010110	316
407	0110010111	317
408	0110011000	318
409	0110011001	319
416	0110100000	320
417	0110100001	321
418	0110100010	322
419	0110100011	323
420	0110100100	324
421	0110100101	325
422	0110100110	326
423	0110100111	327
424	0110101000	328
425	0110101001	329
432	0110110000	330
433	0110110001	331
434	0110110010	332
435	0110110011	333
436	0110110100	334
437	0110110101	335
438	0110110110	336
439	0110110111	337
440	0110111000	338
441	0110111001	339
448	0111000000	340
449	0111000001	341
450	0111000010	342
451	0111000011	343
452	0111000100	344
453	0111000101	345
454	0111000110	346
455	0111000111	347
456	0111001000	348
457	0111001001	349
464	0111010000	350
465	0111010001	351
466	0111010010	352
467	0111010011	353
468	0111010100	354
469	0111010101	355
470	0111010110	356
471	0111010111	357
472	0111011000	358
473	0111011001	359
480	0111100000	360
481	0111100001	361
482	0111100010	362
483	0111100011	363
484	0111100100	364
485	0111100101	365
486	0111100110	366
487	0111100111	367
488	0111101000	368
489	0111101001	369
496	0111110000	370
497	0111110001	371
498	0111110010	372
499	0111110011	373
500	0111110100	374
501	0111110101	375
502	0111110110	376
503	0111110111	377
504	0111111000	378
505	0111111001	379
394	0110001010	380
395	0110001011	381
426	0110101010	382
427	0110101011	383
458	0111001010	384
459	0111001011	385
490	0111101010	386
491	0111101011	387
430	0110101110	388
431	0110101111	389
410	0110011010	390
411	0110011011	391
442	0110111010	392
443	0110111011	393
474	0111011010	394
475	0111011011	395
506	0111111010	396
507	0111111011	397
446	0110111110	398
447	0110111111	399
512	1000000000	400
513	1000000001	401
514	1000000010	402
515	1000000011	403
516	1000000100	404
517	1000000101	405
518	1000000110	406
519	1000000111	407
520	1000001000	408
521	1000001001	409
528	1000010000	410
529	1000010001	411
530	1000010010	412
531	1000010011	413
532	1000010100	414
533	1000010101	415
534	1000010110	416
535	1000010111	417
536	1000011000	418
537	1000011001	419
544	1000100000	420
545	1000100001	421
546	1000100010	422
547	1000100011	423
548	1000100100	424
549	1000100101	425
550	1000100110	426
551	1000100111	427
552	1000101000	428
553	1000101001	429
560	1000110000	430
561	1000110001	431
562	1000110010	432
563	1000110011	433
564	1000110100	434
565	1000110101	435
566	1000110110	436
567	1000110111	437
568	1000111000	438
569	1000111001	439
576	1001000000	440
577	1001000001	441
578	1001000010	442
579	1001000011	443
580	1001000100	444
581	1001000101	445
582	1001000110	446
583	1001000111	447
584	1001001000	448
585	1001001001	449
592	1001010000	450
593	1001010001	451
594	1001010010	452
595	1001010011	453
596	1001010100	454
597	1001010101	455
598	1001010110	456
599	1001010111	457
600	1001011000	458
601	1001011001	459
608	1001100000	460
609	1001100001	461
610	1001100010	462
611	1001100011	463
612	1001100100	464
613	1001100101	465
614	1001100110	466
615	1001100111	467
616	1001101000	468
617	1001101001	469
624	1001110000	470
625	1001110001	471
626	1001110010	472
627	1001110011	473
628	1001110100	474
629	1001110101	475
630	1001110110	476
631	1001110111	477
632	1001111000	478
633	1001111001	479
522	1000001010	480
523	1000001011	481
554	1000101010	482
555	1000101011	483
586	1001001010	484
587	1001001011	485
618	1001101010	486
619	1001101011	487
558	1000101110	488
559	1000101111	489
538	1000011010	490
539	1000011011	491
570	1000111010	492
571	1000111011	493
602	1001011010	494
603	1001011011	495
634	1001111010	496
635	1001111011	497
574	1000111110	498
575	1000111111	499
640	1010000000	500
641	1010000001	501
642	1010000010	502
643	1010000011	503
644	1010000100	504
645	1010000101	505
646	1010000110	506
647	1010000111	507
648	1010001000	508
649	1010001001	509
656	1010010000	510
657	1010010001	511
658	1010010010	512
659	1010010011	513
660	1010010100	514
661	1010010101	515
662	1010010110	516
663	1010010111	517
664	1010011000	518
665	1010011001	519
672	1010100000	520
673	1010100001	521
674	1010100010	522
675	1010100011	523
676	1010100100	524
677	1010100101	525
678	1010100110	526
679	1010100111	527
680	1010101000	528
681	1010101001	529
688	1010110000	530
689	1010110001	531
690	1010110010	532
691	1010110011	533
692	1010110100	534
693	1010110101	535
694	1010110110	536
695	1010110111	537
696	1010111000	538
697	1010111001	539
704	1011000000	540
705	1011000001	541
706	1011000010	542
707	1011000011	543
708	1011000100	544
709	1011000101	545
710	1011000110	546
711	1011000111	547
712	1011001000	548
713	1011001001	549
720	1011010000	550
721	1011010001	551
722	1011010010	552
723	1011010011	553
724	1011010100	554
725	1011010101	555
726	1011010110	556
727	1011010111	557
728	1011011000	558
729	1011011001	559
736	1011100000	560
737	1011100001	561
738	1011100010	562
739	1011100011	563
740	1011100100	564
741	1011100101	565
742	1011100110	566
743	1011100111	567
744	1011101000	568
745	1011101001	569
752	1011110000	570
753	1011110001	571
754	1011110010	572
755	1011110011	573
756	1011110100	574
757	1011110101	575
758	1011110110	576
759	1011110111	577
760	1011111000	578
761	1011111001	579
650	1010001010	580
651	1010001011	581
682	1010101010	582
683	1010101011	583
714	1011001010	584
715	1011001011	585
746	1011101010	586
747	1011101011	587
686	1010101110	588
687	1010101111	589
666	1010011010	590
667	1010011011	591
698	1010111010	592
699	1010111011	593
730	1011011010	594
731	1011011011	595
762	1011111010	596
763	1011111011	597
702	1010111110	598
703	1010111111	599
768	1100000000	600
769	1100000001	601
770	1100000010	602
771	1100000011	603
772	1100000100	604
773	1100000101	605
774	1100000110	606
775	1100000111	607
776	1100001000	608
777	1100001001	609
784	1100010000	610
785	1100010001	611
786	1100010010	612
787	1100010011	613
788	1100010100	614
789	1100010101	615
790	1100010110	616
791	1100010111	617
792	1100011000	618
793	1100011001	619
800	1100100000	620
801	1100100001	621
802	1100100010	622
803	1100100011	623
804	1100100100	624
805	1100100101	625
806	1100100110	626
807	1100100111	627
808	1100101000	628
809	1100101001	629
816	1100110000	630
817	1100110001	631
818	1100110010	632
819	1100110011	633
820	1100110100	634
821	1100110101	635
822	1100110110	636
823	1100110111	637
824	1100111000	638
825	1100111001	639
832	1101000000	640
833	1101000001	641
834	1101000010	642
835	1101000011	643
836	1101000100	644
837	1101000101	645
838	1101000110	646
839	1101000111	647
840	1101001000	648
841	1101001001	649
848	1101010000	650
849	1101010001	651
850	1101010010	652
851	1101010011	653
852	1101010100	654
853	1101010101	655
854	1101010110	656
855	1101010111	657
856	1101011000	658
857	1101011001	659
864	1101100000	660
865	1101100001	661
866	1101100010	662
867	1101100011	663
868	1101100100	664
869	1101100101	665
870	1101100110	666
871	1101100111	667
872	1101101000	668
873	1101101001	669
880	1101110000	670
881	1101110001	671
882	1101110010	672
883	1101110011	673
884	1101110100	674
885	1101110101	675
886	1101110110	676
887	1101110111	677
888	1101111000	678
889	1101111001	679
778	1100001010	680
779	1100001011	681
810	1100101010	682
811	1100101011	683
842	1101001010	684
843	1101001011	685
874	1101101010	686
875	1101101011	687
814	1100101110	688
815	1100101111	689
794	1100011010	690
795	1100011011	691
826	1100111010	692
827	1100111011	693
858	1101011010	694
859	1101011011	695
890	1101111010	696
891	1101111011	697
830	1100111110	698
831	1100111111	699
896	1110000000	700
897	1110000001	701
898	1110000010	702
899	1110000011	703
900	1110000100	704
901	1110000101	705
902	1110000110	706
903	1110000111	707
904	1110001000	708
905	1110001001	709
912	1110010000	710
913	1110010001	711
914	1110010010	712
915	1110010011	713
916	1110010100	714
917	1110010101	715
918	1110010110	716
919	1110010111	717
920	1110011000	718
921	1110011001	719
928	1110100000	720
929	1110100001	721
930	1110100010	722
931	1110100011	723
932	1110100100	724
933	1110100101	725
934	1110100110	726
935	1110100111	727
936	1110101000	728
937	1110101001	729
944	1110110000	730
945	1110110001	731
946	1110110010	732
947	1110110011	733
948	1110110100	734
949	1110110101	735
950	1110110110	736
951	1110110111	737
952	1110111000	738
953	1110111001	739
960	1111000000	740
961	1111000001	741
962	1111000010	742
963	1111000011	743
964	1111000100	744
965	1111000101	745
966	1111000110	746
967	1111000111	747
968	1111001000	748
969	1111001001	749
976	1111010000	750
977	1111010001	751
978	1111010010	752
979	1111010011	753
980	1111010100	754
981	1111010101	755
982	1111010110	756
983	1111010111	757
984	1111011000	758
985	1111011001	759
992	1111100000	760
993	1111100001	761
994	1111100010	762
995	1111100011	763
996	1111100100	764
997	1111100101	765
998	1111100110	766
999	1111100111	767
1000	1111101000	768
1001	1111101001	769
1008	1111110000	770
1009	1111110001	771
1010	1111110010	772
1011	1111110011	773
1012	1111110100	774
1013	1111110101	775
1014	1111110110	776
1015	1111110111	777
1016	1111111000	778
1017	1111111001	779
906	1110001010	780
907	1110001011	781
938	1110101010	782
939	1110101011	783
970	1111001010	784
971	1111001011	785
1002	1111101010	786
1003	1111101011	787
942	1110101110	788
943	1110101111	789
922	1110011010	790
923	1110011011	791
954	1110111010	792
955	1110111011	793
986	1111011010	794
987	1111011011	795
1018	1111111010	796
1019	1111111011	797
958	1110111110	798
959	1110111111	799
12	0000001100	800
13	0000001101	801
268	0100001100	802
269	0100001101	803
524	1000001100	804
525	1000001101	805
780	1100001100	806
781	1100001101	807
78	0001001110	808
79	0001001111	809
28	0000011100	810
29	0000011101	811
284	0100011100	812
285	0100011101	813
540	1000011100	814
541	1000011101	815
796	1100011100	816
797	1100011101	817
94	0001011110	818
95	0001011111	819
44	0000101100	820
45	0000101101	821
300	0100101100	822
301	0100101101	823
556	1000101100	824
557	1000101101	825
812	1100101100	826
813	1100101101	827
334	0101001110	828
335	0101001111	829
60	0000111100	830
61	0000111101	831
316	0100111100	832
317	0100111101	833
572	1000111100	834
573	1000111101	835
828	1100111100	836
829	1100111101	837
350	0101011110	838
351	0101011111	839
76	0001001100	840
77	0001001101	841
332	0101001100	842
333	0101001101	843
588	1001001100	844
589	1001001101	845
844	1101001100	846
845	1101001101	847
590	1001001110	848
591	1001001111	849
92	0001011100	850
93	0001011101	851
348	0101011100	852
349	0101011101	853
604	1001011100	854
605	1001011101	855
860	1101011100	856
861	1101011101	857
606	1001011110	858
607	1001011111	859
108	0001101100	860
109	0001101101	861
364	0101101100	862
365	0101101101	863
620	1001101100	864
621	1001101101	865
876	1101101100	866
877	1101101101	867
846	1101001110	868
847	1101001111	869
124	0001111100	870
125	0001111101	871
380	0101111100	872
381	0101111101	873
636	1001111100	874
637	1001111101	875
892	1101111100	876
893	1101111101	877
862	1101011110	878
863	1101011111	879
14	0000001110	880
15	0000001111	881
270	0100001110	882
271	0100001111	883
526	1000001110	884
527	1000001111	885
782	1100001110	886
783	1100001111	887
110	0001101110	888
111	0001101111	889
30	0000011110	890
31	0000011111	891
286	0100011110	892
287	0100011111	893
542	1000011110	894
543	1000011111	895
798	1100011110	896
799	1100011111	897
126	0001111110	898
127	0001111111	899
140	0010001100	900
141	0010001101	901
396	0110001100	902
397	0110001101	903
652	1010001100	904
653	1010001101	905
908	1110001100	906
909	1110001101	907
206	0011001110	908
207	0011001111	909
156	0010011100	910
157	0010011101	911
412	0110011100	912
413	0110011101	913
668	1010011100	914
669	1010011101	915
924	1110011100	916
925	1110011101	917
222	0011011110	918
223	0011011111	919
172	0010101100	920
173	0010101101	921
428	0110101100	922
429	0110101101	923
684	1010101100	924
685	1010101101	925
940	1110101100	926
941	1110101101	927
462	0111001110	928
463	0111001111	929
188	0010111100	930
189	0010111101	931
444	0110111100	932
445	0110111101	933
700	1010111100	934
701	1010111101	935
956	1110111100	936
957	1110111101	937
478	0111011110	938
479	0111011111	939
204	0011001100	940
205	0011001101	941
460	0111001100	942
461	0111001101	943
716	1011001100	944
717	1011001101	945
972	1111001100	946
973	1111001101	947
718	1011001110	948
719	1011001111	949
220	0011011100	950
221	0011011101	951
476	0111011100	952
477	0111011101	953
732	1011011100	954
733	1011011101	955
988	1111011100	956
989	1111011101	957
734	1011011110	958
735	1011011111	959
236	0011101100	960
237	0011101101	961
492	0111101100	962
493	0111101101	963
748	1011101100	964
749	1011101101	965
1004	1111101100	966
1005	1111101101	967
974	1111001110	968
975	1111001111	969
252	0011111100	970
253	0011111101	971
508	0111111100	972
509	0111111101	973
764	1011111100	974
765	1011111101	975
1020	1111111100	976
1021	1111111101	977
990	1111011110	978
991	1111011111	979
142	0010001110	980
143	0010001111	981
398	0110001110	982
399	0110001111	983
654	1010001110	984
655	1010001111	985
910	1110001110	986
911	1110001111	987
238	0011101110	988
239	0011101111	989
158	0010011110	990
159	0010011111	991
414	0110011110	992
415	0110011111	993
670	1010011110	994
671	1010011111	995
926	1110011110	996
927	1110011111	997
254	0011111110	998
255	0011111111	999

The 8 decimal values whose digits are all 8s or 9s have four codings each. The bits marked x in the table above are ignored on input, but will always be 0 in computed results. The 8 × 3 = 24 non-standard encodings fill in the gap between 10^{3} = 1000 and 2^{10} = 1024.

In the above cases, with the true significand as the sequence of decimal digits decoded, the value represented is

$$(-1)^\text{signbit}\times 10^{\text{exponentbits}_2-398_{10}}\times \text{truesignificand}_{10}$$

== Implementations ==
There are multiple libraries available for calculations with decimal data types. Some examples are listed below:

- Libdfp implements the ISO/IEC Technical Report "ISO/IEC TR 24732". The library implements math functions for environments built on gcc and glibc. It uses BID-encoded IEEE 754 decimal types, with the possibility to switch to Decimal64 floating-point format via recompilation of gcc. The library can be slow, and sometimes inaccurate, for conversions and complicated operations.
- Intel Decimal Floating-Point Math Library is a C library that implements the IEEE 754-2008 Decimal Floating-Point Arithmetic specification by addressing decimal types as UINTxx items named decimalxx. The library improves performance by calculating more intricate functions in binary where possible, but this introduces some binary rounding errors into decimal calculations.
- decNumber provides data types and functions to calculate values using Decimal Floating-Point with arbitrary precision. It features the option to set the IEEE 754-compatible parameters decSingle, decDouble, and decQuad. It efficiently performs conversions between decimal numbers and strings.
- Mpdecimal is an implementation of the General Decimal Arithmetic Specification proposed by Mike Cowlishaw, with the option to set IEEE type-compatible parameters. It provides arbitrary precision, using an 8-bit integer to encode runtime flags and the number’s sign. The library represents numbers using seven or more double- or quad-words, storing the signed exponent, the digits, the length in words, the allocated words, a pointer to data, and data itself. Data is stored as an array of two or more words, which holds the coefficient in 32-bit (9-digit) or 64-bit (19-digit) items. The library can handle a wide range of inputs and produces accurate results. It is implemented in Python as the decimal module.

== See also ==
- ISO/IEC 10967, Language Independent Arithmetic
- Primitive data type
- D notation (scientific notation)
