= RAD50 =

Rad50 may refer to:

- RADIX-50, a character encoding scheme in computing
- DNA repair protein RAD50, protein involved in DNA double-strand break (DSB) repair and encoded by the gene RAD50
