= SQUOZE =

Compression scheme

SQUOZE (abbreviated as SQZ) is a memory-efficient representation of a combined source and relocatable object program file with a symbol table on punched cards which was introduced in 1958 with the SCAT assembler on the SHARE Operating System (SOS) for the IBM 709. A program in this format was called a SQUOZE deck. It was also used on later machines including the IBM 7090 and 7094.

== SQUOZE deck ==
A SQUOZE deck contains an encoded binary form of the original assembly language code. That encoded form is not executable code that can be run by the machine; SQUOZE decks are converted to absolute machine code and stored in memory by a loader program.

== Identifier name character encoding ==
In the SQUOZE encoding, identifiers in the symbol table were represented in a 50-character alphabet, allowing a 36-bit machine word to represent six alphanumeric characters plus two flag bits, thus saving two bits per six characters, because the six bits normally allocated for each character could store up to 64 states rather than only the 50 states needed to represent the 50 letters of the alphabet, and 50^{6} < 2^{34}.

SQUOZE character codes
Most significant digits			Least significant digits							
		Dec	+0	+1	+2	+3	+4	+5	+6	+7
		Oct	0	1	2	3	4	5	6	7
Dec	Oct	Bin	000	001	010	011	100	101	110	111
+0	0	000	space	0	1	2	3	4	5	6
+8	1	001	7	8	9	A	B	C	D	E
+16	2	010	F	G	H	I	J	K	L	M
+24	3	011	N	O	P	Q	R	S	T	U
+32	4	100	V	W	X	Y	Z	= #	/ %	) ⌑
+40	5	101	+ &	-	@	+ &	-	*	/	$
+48	6	110	,	.	—N/a	—N/a	—N/a	—N/a	—N/a	—N/a

Using base 50 already saves a single bit every three characters, so it was used in two three-character chunks. The manual has a formula for encoding six characters ABCDEF: $(A*50^2 + B*50 + C) * 2^{17} + (D*50^2 + E*50 + F)$

For example "SQUOZE", normally 36 bits: 35 33 37 31 44 17_{(base 8)} would be encoded in two 17-bit pieces to fit in the 34 bits as ( 0o220231 << 17 ) | 0o175473 == 0o110114575473.

A simpler example of the same logic would be how a three-digit BCD number would take up 12 bits, such as 987: 9 8 7_{(base 16)} 1001 1000 0111_{(base 2)}, but any such value could be stored in 10 bits directly, saving two bits, such as 987: 3db_{(base 16)} 11 1101 1011_{(base 2)}.

== Etymology ==
"Squoze" is a facetious past participle of the verb 'to squeeze'.

The name SQUOZE was later borrowed for similar character encoding schemes used on DEC machines; they had a 40-character alphabet (50 in octal) and were called DEC RADIX 50 and MOD40, but sometimes nicknamed DEC Squoze.

== See also ==
- Packed BCD
- Hertz encoding
- Chen–Ho encoding
- Densely packed decimal (DPD)
- BCD (character encoding)
- Base 50 (numeral system)
- Base conversion
