= Densely packed decimal =

Efficient system of binary encoding for decimal digits used in decimal floating point

Densely packed decimal (DPD) is an efficient method for binary encoding decimal digits.

The traditional system of binary encoding for decimal digits, known as binary-coded decimal (BCD), uses four bits to encode each digit, resulting in significant wastage of binary data bandwidth (since four bits can store 16 states and are being used to store only 10), even when using packed BCD. Densely packed decimal is a more efficient code that packs three digits into ten bits using a scheme that allows compression from, or expansion to, BCD with only two or three hardware gate delays.

The densely packed decimal encoding is a refinement of Chen–Ho encoding; it gives the same compression and speed advantages, but the particular arrangement of bits used confers additional advantages:

- Compression of one or two digits (into the optimal four or seven bits respectively) is achieved as a subset of the three-digit encoding. This means that arbitrary numbers of decimal digits (not only multiples of three digits) can be encoded efficiently. For example, 38 = 12 × 3 + 2 decimal digits can be encoded in 12 × 10 + 7 = 127 bits – that is, 12 sets of three decimal digits can be encoded using 12 sets of ten binary bits and the remaining two decimal digits can be encoded using a further seven binary bits.
- The subset encoding mentioned above is simply the rightmost bits of the standard three-digit encoding; the encoded value can be widened simply by adding leading 0 bits.
- All seven-bit BCD numbers (0 through 79) are encoded identically by DPD. This makes conversions of common small numbers trivial. (This must break down at 80, because that requires eight bits for BCD, but the above property requires that the DPD encoding must fit into seven bits.)
- The low-order bit of each digit is copied unmodified. Thus, the non-trivial portion of the encoding can be considered a conversion from three base-5 digits to seven binary bits. Further, digit-wise logical values (in which each digit is either 0 or 1) can be manipulated directly without any encoding or decoding being necessary.

== History ==
In 1969, Theodore M. Hertz, and in 1971, Tien Chi Chen (陳天機) with Irving Tze Ho (何宜慈) devised lossless prefix codes (referred to as Hertz and Chen–Ho encodings) which packed three decimal digits into ten binary bits using a scheme which allowed compression from or expansion to BCD with only two or three gate delays in hardware. Densely packed decimal is a refinement of this, devised by Mike F. Cowlishaw in 2002, which was incorporated into the IEEE 754-2008 and ISO/IEC/IEEE 60559:2011 standards for decimal floating point.

== Encoding ==
Like Chen–Ho encoding, DPD encoding classifies each decimal digit into one of two ranges, depending on the most significant bit of the binary form: "small" digits have values 0 through 7 (binary 0000–0111), and "large" digits, 8 through 9 (binary 1000–1001). Once it is known or has been indicated that a digit is small, three more bits are still required to specify the value. If a large value has been indicated, only one bit is required to distinguish between the values 8 or 9.

When encoding, the most significant bits of each of the three digits to be encoded determine one of eight coding patterns for the remaining bits, according to the following table. The table shows how, on decoding, the ten bits of the coded form in columns b9 through b0 are copied into the three digits d2 through d0, and the remaining bits are filled in with constant zeros or ones.

Densely packed decimal encoding rules
DPD encoded value											Decimal digits					
Code space (1024 states)	b9	b8	b7	b6	b5	b4	b3	b2	b1	b0	d2	d1	d0	Values encoded	Description	Occurrences (1000 states)
50.0% (512 states)	a	b	c	d	e	f	0	g	h	i	0abc	0def	0ghi	(0–7) (0–7) (0–7)	3 small digits	51.2% (512 states)
37.5% (384 states)	a	b	c	d	e	f	1	0	0	i	0abc	0def	100i	(0–7) (0–7) (8–9)	2 small digits, 1 large digit	38.4% (384 states)
37.5% (384 states)	a	b	c	g	h	f	1	0	1	i	0abc	100f	0ghi	(0–7) (8–9) (0–7)	2 small digits, 1 large digit	38.4% (384 states)
37.5% (384 states)	g	h	c	d	e	f	1	1	0	i	100c	0def	0ghi	(8–9) (0–7) (0–7)	2 small digits, 1 large digit	38.4% (384 states)
9.375% (96 states)	g	h	c	0	0	f	1	1	1	i	100c	100f	0ghi	(8–9) (8–9) (0–7)	1 small digit, 2 large digits	9.6% (96 states)
9.375% (96 states)	d	e	c	0	1	f	1	1	1	i	100c	0def	100i	(8–9) (0–7) (8–9)	1 small digit, 2 large digits	9.6% (96 states)
9.375% (96 states)	a	b	c	1	0	f	1	1	1	i	0abc	100f	100i	(0–7) (8–9) (8–9)	1 small digit, 2 large digits	9.6% (96 states)
3.125% (32 states, 8 used)	x	x	c	1	1	f	1	1	1	i	100c	100f	100i	(8–9) (8–9) (8–9)	3 large digits, b9, b8: don't care	0.8% (8 states)

Bits b7, b4 and b0 (c, f and i) are passed through the encoding unchanged, and do not affect the meaning of the other bits. The remaining seven bits can be considered a seven-bit encoding for three base-5 digits.

Bits b8 and b9 are not needed and ignored when decoding DPD groups with three large digits (marked as "x" in the last row of the table above), but are filled with zeros when encoding.

The eight decimal values whose digits are all 8s or 9s have four codings each. The bits marked x in the table above are ignored on input, but will always be 0 in computed results. (The 3 × 8 = 24 non-standard encodings fill in the gap between 10^{3} = 1000 and 2^{10} = 1024.)

== Examples ==
This table shows some representative decimal numbers and their encodings in BCD, Chen–Ho, and densely packed decimal (DPD):

Decimal	BCD	Chen–Ho	DPD
005	0000 0000 0101	000 000 0101	000 000 0101
009	0000 0000 1001	110 000 0001	000 000 1001
055	0000 0101 0101	000 010 1101	000 101 0101
079	0000 0111 1001	110 011 1001	000 111 1001
080	0000 1000 0000	101 000 0000	000 000 1010
099	0000 1001 1001	111 000 1001	000 101 1111
555	0101 0101 0101	010 110 1101	101 101 0101
999	1001 1001 1001	111 111 1001	001 111 1111

== See also ==
- Binary-coded decimal (BCD)
- Binary integer decimal (BID)
- decimal32 floating-point format
- decimal64 floating-point format
- decimal128 floating-point format
- DEC RADIX 50 / MOD40
- IBM SQUOZE
