= Chen–Ho encoding =

Memory-efficient binary encoding of decimal digits

Chen–Ho encoding is a memory-efficient alternate system of binary encoding for decimal digits.

The traditional system of binary encoding for decimal digits, known as binary-coded decimal (BCD), uses four bits to encode each digit, resulting in significant wastage of binary data bandwidth (since four bits can store 16 states and are being used to store only 10), even when using packed BCD.

The encoding reduces the storage requirements of two decimal digits (100 states) from 8 to 7 bits, and those of three decimal digits (1000 states) from 12 to 10 bits using only simple Boolean transformations avoiding any complex arithmetic operations like a base conversion.

== History ==
In what appears to have been a multiple discovery, some of the concepts behind what later became known as Chen–Ho encoding were independently developed by Theodore M. Hertz in 1969 and by Tien Chi Chen (陳天機) (1928–) in 1971.

Hertz of Rockwell filed a patent for his encoding in 1969, which was granted in 1971.

Chen first discussed his ideas with Irving Tze Ho (何宜慈) (1921–2003) in 1971. Chen and Ho were both working for IBM at the time, albeit in different locations. Chen also consulted with Frank Chin Tung to verify the results of his theories independently. IBM filed a patent in their name in 1973, which was granted in 1974. At least by 1973, Hertz's earlier work must have been known to them, as the patent cites his patent as prior art.

With input from Joseph D. Rutledge and John C. McPherson, the final version of the Chen–Ho encoding was circulated inside IBM in 1974 and published in 1975 in the journal Communications of the ACM. This version included several refinements, primarily related to the application of the encoding system. It constitutes a Huffman-like prefix code.

The encoding was referred to as Chen and Ho's scheme in 1975, Chen's encoding in 1982 and became known as Chen–Ho encoding or Chen–Ho algorithm since 2000. After having filed a patent for it in 2001, Michael F. Cowlishaw published a further refinement of Chen–Ho encoding known as densely packed decimal (DPD) encoding in IEE Proceedings – Computers and Digital Techniques in 2002. DPD has subsequently been adopted as the decimal encoding used in the IEEE 754-2008 and ISO/IEC/IEEE 60559:2011 floating-point standards.

== Application ==
Chen noted that the digits zero through seven were simply encoded using three binary digits of the corresponding octal group. He also postulated that one could use a flag to identify a different encoding for the digits eight and nine, which would be encoded using a single bit.

In practice, a series of Boolean transformations are applied to the stream of input bits, compressing BCD encoded digits from 12 bits per three digits to 10 bits per three digits. Reversed transformations are used to decode the resulting coded stream to BCD. Equivalent results can also be achieved by the use of a look-up table.

Chen–Ho encoding is limited to encoding sets of three decimal digits into groups of 10 bits (so called declets). Of the 1024 states possible by using 10 bits, it leaves only 24 states unused (with don't care bits typically set to 0 on write and ignored on read). With only 2.34% wastage it gives a 20% more efficient encoding than BCD with one digit in 4 bits.

Both, Hertz and Chen also proposed similar, but less efficient, encoding schemes to compress sets of two decimal digits (requiring 8 bits in BCD) into groups of 7 bits.

Larger sets of decimal digits could be divided into three- and two-digit groups.

The patents also discuss the possibility to adapt the scheme to digits encoded in any other decimal codes than 8-4-2-1 BCD, like f.e. Excess-3, Excess-6, Jump-at-2, Jump-at-8, Gray, Glixon, O'Brien type-I and Gray–Stibitz code. (Note: Some 4-bit decimal codes are particularly well suited as alternatives to the 8-4-2-1 BCD code: Jump-at-8 code uses the same values for the ordered states 0 to 7, whereas in the Gray BCD and Glixon codes the values for the states 0 to 7 are still from the same set, but ordered differently (which, however, is transparent for the Hertz, Chen–Ho or densely packed decimal (DPD) encodings, as they pass through the bits unaltered). In these four codes, the most-significant bit can be used as a flag denoting "large" values. For the two "large" values, all but one bits remain static (the two middle bits are always zero for 8-4-2-1 and one for Jump-at-8 code, whilst for Gray BCD code one bit is set and the other cleared, whereas for Glixon code the two lower bits are always zero and one bit inverted, thus the two "large" values being transparently swapped), requiring only minor adaptations in the encoding. Three other codes can be conveniently split into groups of eight and two states as well, containing values from two ranges of consecutive bit patterns. In the case of the and Excess-6 BCD and Jump-at-2 codes, the most-significant bit can still be used to distinguish between the two groups, however, compared to the Jump-at-8 code, the group of small values now contains only two states and the larger group contains the eight larger values. In the case of the O'Brien type-I and Gray–Stibitz code, the next-most significant bit can serve as a flag bit instead, with the remaining bits again forming two groups of consecutive values. Therefore, these differences remain transparent for the encoding.) The same principles could also be applied to other bases.

In 1973, some form of Chen–Ho encoding appears to have been utilized in the address conversion hardware of the optional IBM 7070/7074 emulation feature for the IBM System/370 Model 165 and 370 Model 168 computers.

One prominent application uses a 128-bit register to store 33 decimal digits with a three digit exponent, effectively not less than what could be achieved using binary encoding (whereas BCD encoding would need 144 bits to store the same number of digits).

== Encodings for two decimal digits ==
=== Hertz encoding ===
Hertz decimal data encoding for a single heptad (1969 form)
Binary encoding								Decimal digits				
Code space (128 states)	b6	b5	b4	b3	b2	b1	b0	d1	d0	Values encoded	Description	Occurrences (100 states)
50% (64 states)	0	a	b	c	d	e	f	0abc	0def	(0–7) (0–7)	Two lower digits	64% (64 states)
12.5% (16 states)	1	1	0	c	d	e	f	100c	0def	(8–9) (0–7)	One lower digit, one higher digit	16% (16 states)
12.5% (16 states)	1	0	1	f	a	b	c	0abc	100f	(0–7) (8–9)	One lower digit, one higher digit	16% (16 states)
12.5% (16 states, 4 used)	1	1	1	c	x	x	f	100c	100f	(8–9) (8–9)	Two higher digits	4% (4 states)
12.5% (16 states, 0 used)	1	0	0	x	x	x	x					0% (0 states)

- This encoding is not parity-preserving.

=== Early Chen–Ho encoding, method A ===
Decimal data encoding for a single heptad (early 1971 form, method A)
Binary encoding								Decimal digits				
Code space (128 states)	b6	b5	b4	b3	b2	b1	b0	d1	d0	Values encoded	Description	Occurrences (100 states)
50% (64 states)	0	a	b	c	d	e	f	0abc	0def	(0–7) (0–7)	Two lower digits	64% (64 states)
25% (32 states, 16 used)	1	0	x (b)	c	d	e	f	100c	0def	(8–9) (0–7)	One lower digit, one higher digit	16% (16 states)
12.5% (16 states)	1	1	0	f	a	b	c	0abc	100f	(0–7) (8–9)	One lower digit, one higher digit	16% (16 states)
12.5% (16 states, 4 used)	1	1	1	c	x (a)	x (b)	f	100c	100f	(8–9) (8–9)	Two higher digits	4% (4 states)

- This encoding is not parity-preserving.

=== Early Chen–Ho encoding, method B ===
Decimal data encoding for a single heptad (early 1971 form, method B)
Binary encoding								Decimal digits				
Code space (128 states)	b6	b5	b4	b3	b2	b1	b0	d1	d0	Values encoded	Description	Occurrences (100 states)
50% (64 states)	0	a	b	c	d	e	f	0abc	0def	(0–7) (0–7)	Two lower digits	64% (64 states)
12.5% (16 states)	1	0	c	0	d	e	f	100c	0def	(8–9) (0–7)	One lower digit, one higher digit	16% (16 states)
12.5% (16 states, 4 used)	1	0	c	1	x	x	f	100c	100f	(8–9) (8–9)	Two higher digits	4% (4 states)
12.5% (16 states)	1	1	f	0	a	b	c	0abc	100f	(0–7) (8–9)	One lower digit, one higher digit	16% (16 states)
12.5% (16 states, 0 used)	1	1	x	1	x	x	x					0% (0 states)

- This encoding is not parity-preserving.

=== Patented and final Chen–Ho encoding ===
Decimal data encoding for a single heptad (patented 1973 form and final 1975 form)
Binary encoding								Decimal digits				
Code space (128 states)	b6	b5	b4	b3	b2	b1	b0	d1	d0	Values encoded	Description	Occurrences (100 states)
50% (64 states)	0	a	b	c	d	e	f	0abc	0def	(0–7) (0–7)	Two lower digits	64% (64 states)
25.0% (32 states, 16 used)	1	0	x (b)	c	d	e	f	100c	0def	(8–9) (0–7)	One lower digit, one higher digit	16% (16 states)
12.5% (16 states)	1	1	1	c	a	b	f	0abc	100f	(0–7) (8–9)	One lower digit, one higher digit	16% (16 states)
12.5% (16 states, 4 used)	1	1	0	c	x (a)	x (b)	f	100c	100f	(8–9) (8–9)	Two higher digits	4% (4 states)

- Assuming certain values for the don't-care bits (f.e. 0), this encoding is parity-preserving.

== Encodings for three decimal digits ==
=== Hertz encoding ===
Hertz decimal data encoding for a single declet (1969 form)
Binary encoding											Decimal digits					
Code space (1024 states)	b9	b8	b7	b6	b5	b4	b3	b2	b1	b0	d2	d1	d0	Values encoded	Description	Occurrences (1000 states)
50.0% (512 states)	0	a	b	c	d	e	f	g	h	i	0abc	0def	0ghi	(0–7) (0–7) (0–7)	Three lower digits	51.2% (512 states)
37.5% (384 states)	1	0	0	c	d	e	f	g	h	i	100c	0def	0ghi	(8–9) (0–7) (0–7)	Two lower digits, one higher digit	38.4% (384 states)
37.5% (384 states)	1	0	1	f	a	b	c	g	h	i	0abc	100f	0ghi	(0–7) (8–9) (0–7)	Two lower digits, one higher digit	38.4% (384 states)
37.5% (384 states)	1	1	0	i	a	b	c	d	e	f	0abc	0def	100i	(0–7) (0–7) (8–9)	Two lower digits, one higher digit	38.4% (384 states)
9.375% (96 states)	1	1	1	f	0	0	i	a	b	c	0abc	100f	100i	(0–7) (8–9) (8–9)	One lower digit, two higher digits	9.6% (96 states)
9.375% (96 states)	1	1	1	c	0	1	i	d	e	f	100c	0def	100i	(8–9) (0–7) (8–9)	One lower digit, two higher digits	9.6% (96 states)
9.375% (96 states)	1	1	1	c	1	0	f	g	h	i	100c	100f	0ghi	(8–9) (8–9) (0–7)	One lower digit, two higher digits	9.6% (96 states)
3.125% (32 states, 8 used)	1	1	1	c	1	1	f	(0)	(0)	i	100c	100f	100i	(8–9) (8–9) (8–9)	Three higher digits, bits b2 and b1 are don't care	0.8% (8 states)

- This encoding is not parity-preserving.

=== Early Chen–Ho encoding ===
Decimal data encoding for a single declet (early 1971 form)
Binary encoding											Decimal digits					
Code space (1024 states)	b9	b8	b7	b6	b5	b4	b3	b2	b1	b0	d2	d1	d0	Values encoded	Description	Occurrences (1000 states)
50.0% (512 states)	0	a	b	c	d	e	f	g	h	i	0abc	0def	0ghi	(0–7) (0–7) (0–7)	Three lower digits	51.2% (512 states)
37.5% (384 states)	1	0	0	c	d	e	f	g	h	i	100c	0def	0ghi	(8–9) (0–7) (0–7)	Two lower digits, one higher digit	38.4% (384 states)
37.5% (384 states)	1	0	1	f	g	h	i	a	b	c	0abc	100f	0ghi	(0–7) (8–9) (0–7)	Two lower digits, one higher digit	38.4% (384 states)
37.5% (384 states)	1	1	0	i	a	b	c	d	e	f	0abc	0def	100i	(0–7) (0–7) (8–9)	Two lower digits, one higher digit	38.4% (384 states)
9.375% (96 states)	1	1	1	0	0	f	i	a	b	c	0abc	100f	100i	(0–7) (8–9) (8–9)	One lower digit, two higher digits	9.6% (96 states)
9.375% (96 states)	1	1	1	0	1	i	c	d	e	f	100c	0def	100i	(8–9) (0–7) (8–9)	One lower digit, two higher digits	9.6% (96 states)
9.375% (96 states)	1	1	1	1	0	c	f	g	h	i	100c	100f	0ghi	(8–9) (8–9) (0–7)	One lower digit, two higher digits	9.6% (96 states)
3.125% (32 states, 8 used)	1	1	1	1	1	c	f	i	(0)	(0)	100c	100f	100i	(8–9) (8–9) (8–9)	Three higher digits, bits b1 and b0 are don't care	0.8% (8 states)

- This encoding is not parity-preserving.

=== Patented Chen–Ho encoding ===
Decimal data encoding for a single declet (patented 1973 form)
Binary encoding											Decimal digits					
Code space (1024 states)	b9	b8	b7	b6	b5	b4	b3	b2	b1	b0	d2	d1	d0	Values encoded	Description	Occurrences (1000 states)
50.0% (512 states)	0	a	b	d	e	g	h	c	f	i	0abc	0def	0ghi	(0–7) (0–7) (0–7)	Three lower digits	51.2% (512 states)
37.5% (384 states)	1	0	0	d	e	g	h	c	f	i	100c	0def	0ghi	(8–9) (0–7) (0–7)	Two lower digits, one higher digit	38.4% (384 states)
37.5% (384 states)	1	0	1	a	b	g	h	c	f	i	0abc	100f	0ghi	(0–7) (8–9) (0–7)	Two lower digits, one higher digit	38.4% (384 states)
37.5% (384 states)	1	1	0	d	e	a	b	c	f	i	0abc	0def	100i	(0–7) (0–7) (8–9)	Two lower digits, one higher digit	38.4% (384 states)
9.375% (96 states)	1	1	1	1	0	a	b	c	f	i	0abc	100f	100i	(0–7) (8–9) (8–9)	One lower digit, two higher digits	9.6% (96 states)
9.375% (96 states)	1	1	1	0	1	d	e	c	f	i	100c	0def	100i	(8–9) (0–7) (8–9)	One lower digit, two higher digits	9.6% (96 states)
9.375% (96 states)	1	1	1	0	0	g	h	c	f	i	100c	100f	0ghi	(8–9) (8–9) (0–7)	One lower digit, two higher digits	9.6% (96 states)
3.125% (32 states, 8 used)	1	1	1	1	1	(0)	(0)	c	f	i	100c	100f	100i	(8–9) (8–9) (8–9)	Three higher digits, bits b4 and b3 are don't care	0.8% (8 states)

- This encoding is not parity-preserving.

=== Final Chen–Ho encoding ===
Chen-Ho decimal data encoding for a single declet (final 1975 form)
Binary encoding											Decimal digits					
Code space (1024 states)	b9	b8	b7	b6	b5	b4	b3	b2	b1	b0	d2	d1	d0	Values encoded	Description	Occurrences (1000 states)
50.0% (512 states)	0	a	b	c	d	e	f	g	h	i	0abc	0def	0ghi	(0–7) (0–7) (0–7)	Three lower digits	51.2% (512 states)
37.5% (384 states)	1	0	0	c	d	e	f	g	h	i	100c	0def	0ghi	(8–9) (0–7) (0–7)	Two lower digits, one higher digit	38.4% (384 states)
37.5% (384 states)	1	0	1	c	a	b	f	g	h	i	0abc	100f	0ghi	(0–7) (8–9) (0–7)	Two lower digits, one higher digit	38.4% (384 states)
37.5% (384 states)	1	1	0	c	d	e	f	a	b	i	0abc	0def	100i	(0–7) (0–7) (8–9)	Two lower digits, one higher digit	38.4% (384 states)
9.375% (96 states)	1	1	1	c	0	0	f	a	b	i	0abc	100f	100i	(0–7) (8–9) (8–9)	One lower digit, two higher digits	9.6% (96 states)
9.375% (96 states)	1	1	1	c	0	1	f	d	e	i	100c	0def	100i	(8–9) (0–7) (8–9)	One lower digit, two higher digits	9.6% (96 states)
9.375% (96 states)	1	1	1	c	1	0	f	g	h	i	100c	100f	0ghi	(8–9) (8–9) (0–7)	One lower digit, two higher digits	9.6% (96 states)
3.125% (32 states, 8 used)	1	1	1	c	1	1	f	(0)	(0)	i	100c	100f	100i	(8–9) (8–9) (8–9)	Three higher digits, bits b2 and b1 are don't care	0.8% (8 states)

- This encoding is not parity-preserving.

== Storage efficiency ==
Storage efficiency
BCD				Necessary bits				Bit difference	
Digits	States	Bits	Binary code space	Binary encoding [A]	2-digit encoding [B]	3-digit encoding [C]	Mixed encoding	Mixed vs. Binary	Mixed vs. BCD
1	10	4	16	4	(7)	(10)	4 [1×A]	0	0
2	100	8	128	7	7	(10)	7 [1×B]	0	−1
3	1000	12	1024	10	(14)	10	10 [1×C]	0	−2
4	10000	16	16384	14	14	(20)	14 [2×B]	0	−2
5	100000	20	131072	17	(21)	(20)	17 [1×C+1×B]	0	−3
6	1000000	24	1048576	20	21	20	20 [2×C]	0	−4
7	10000000	28	16777216	24	(28)	(30)	24 [2×C+1×A]	0	−4
8	100000000	32	134217728	27	28	(30)	27 [2×C+1×B]	0	−5
9	1000000000	36	1073741824	30	(35)	30	30 [3×C]	0	−6
10	10000000000	40	17179869184	34	35	(40)	34 [3×C+1×A]	0	−6
11	100000000000	44	137438953472	37	(42)	(40)	37 [3×C+1×B]	0	−7
12	1000000000000	48	1099511627776	40	42	40	40 [4×C]	0	−8
13	10000000000000	52	17592186044416	44	(49)	(50)	44 [4×C+1×A]	0	−8
14	100000000000000	56	140737488355328	47	49	(50)	47 [4×C+1×B]	0	−9
15	1000000000000000	60	1125899906842624	50	(56)	50	50 [5×C]	0	−10
16	10000000000000000	64	18014398509481984	54	56	(60)	54 [5×C+1×A]	0	−10
17	100000000000000000	68	144115188075855872	57	(63)	(60)	57 [5×C+1×B]	0	−11
18	1000000000000000000	72	1152921504606846976	60	63	60	60 [6×C]	0	−12
19	10000000000000000000	76	18446744073709551616	64	(70)	(70)	64 [6×C+1×A]	0	−12
20	…	80	…	67	70	(70)	67 [6×C+1×B]	0	−13
21	…	84	…	70	(77)	70	70 [7×C]	0	−14
22	…	88	…	74	77	(80)	74 [7×C+1×A]	0	−14
23	…	92	…	77	(84)	(80)	77 [7×C+1×B]	0	−15
24	…	96	…	80	84	80	80 [8×C]	0	−16
25	…	100	…	84	(91)	(90)	84 [8×C+1×A]	0	−16
26	…	104	…	87	91	(90)	87 [8×C+1×B]	0	−17
27	…	108	…	90	(98)	90	90 [9×C]	0	−18
28	…	112	…	94	98	(100)	94 [9×C+1×A]	0	−18
29	…	116	…	97	(105)	(100)	97 [9×C+1×B]	0	−19
30	…	120	…	100	105	100	100 [10×C]	0	−20
31	…	124	…	103	(112)	(110)	104 [10×C+1×A]	+1	−20
32	…	128	…	107	112	(110)	107 [10×C+1×B]	0	−21
33	…	132	…	110	(119)	110	110 [11×C]	0	−22
34	…	136	…	113	119	(120)	114 [11×C+1×A]	+1	−22
35	…	140	…	117	(126)	(120)	117 [11×C+1×B]	0	−23
36	…	144	…	120	126	120	120 [12×C]	0	−24
37	…	148	…	123	(133)	(130)	124 [12×C+1×A]	+1	−24
38	…	152	…	127	133	(130)	127 [12×C+1×B]	0	−25
…	…	…	…	…	…	…	…	…	…

== See also ==
- Binary-coded decimal (BCD)
- Densely packed decimal (DPD)
- DEC RADIX 50 / MOD40
- IBM SQUOZE
- Packed BCD
- Unicode transformation format (UTF) (similar encoding scheme)
- Length-limited Huffman code
