= ISO/IEC 10967 =

Computer arithmetic standards

ISO/IEC 10967, Language independent arithmetic (LIA), is a series of standards on computer arithmetic. It is compatible with IEEE 754 (also published as IEC 60559), and much of the specifications are for IEEE 754 special values (though such values are not required by LIA itself, unless the parameter iec_{559} is true). It was developed by the working group ISO/IEC JTC1/SC22/WG11, which was disbanded in 2011.

LIA consists of three parts:

- Part 1: Integer and floating point arithmetic, second edition published 2012.
- Part 2: Elementary numerical functions, first edition published 2001.
- Part 3: Complex integer and floating point arithmetic and complex elementary numerical functions, first edition published 2006.

== Parts ==
=== Part 1 ===
Part 1 deals with the basic integer and floating point datatypes (for multiple radices, including 2 and 10), but unlike IEEE 754-2008 not the representation of the values. Part 1 also deals with basic arithmetic, including comparisons, on values of such datatypes. The parameter iec_{559} is expected to be true for most implementations of LIA-1.

Part 1 was revised, to the second edition, to become more in line with the specifications in parts 2 and 3.

=== Part 2 ===
Part 2 deals with some additional "basic" operations on integer and floating point datatype values, but focuses primarily on specifying requirements on numerical versions of elementary functions. Much of the specifications in LIA-2 are inspired by the specifications in Ada for elementary functions.

=== Part 3 ===
Part 3 generalizes parts 1 and 2 to deal with imaginary and complex datatypes and arithmetic and elementary functions on such values. Much of the specifications in LIA-3 are inspired by the specifications for imaginary and complex datatypes and operations in C, Ada and Common Lisp.

== Bindings ==
Each of the parts provide suggested bindings for a number of programming languages. These are not part of the LIA standards, just suggestions, and are not complete. Authors of a programming language standard may wish to alter the suggestions before any incorporation in the programming language standard.

The C99, C11 and C17 standards for C, and in 2013, the standards for C++ and Modula-2, have partial bindings to LIA-1.

== See also ==
- ISO/IEC 11404, General purpose datatypes
