= Hexadecimal floating point =

Hexadecimal floating point may refer to:

- IBM hexadecimal floating point in the IBM System 360 and 370 series of computers and others since 1964
- Hexadecimal floating-point arithmetic in the Illinois ILLIAC III computer in 1966
- Hexadecimal floating-point arithmetic in the SDS Sigma 7 computer in 1966
- Hexadecimal floating-point arithmetic in the SDS Sigma 5 computer in 1967
- Hexadecimal floating-point arithmetic in the Xerox Sigma 9 computer in 1970
- Hexadecimal floating-point arithmetic in the Interdata 8/32 computer in the 1970s
- Hexadecimal floating-point arithmetic in the Manchester MU5 computer in 1972
- Hexadecimal floating-point arithmetic in the Data General Eclipse S/200 computer in ca. 1974
- Hexadecimal floating-point arithmetic in the Gould Powernode 9080 computer in the 1980s
- Hexadecimal floating-point arithmetic in the HEP computer in 1982
- Hexadecimal floating-point arithmetic in the SEL System 85 computer
- Hexadecimal floating-point arithmetic in the SEL System 86 computer

== See also ==
- Hexadecimal
- Floating-point arithmetic
