= ILLIAC I =

Vacuum tube computer built in 1952 by the University of Illinois

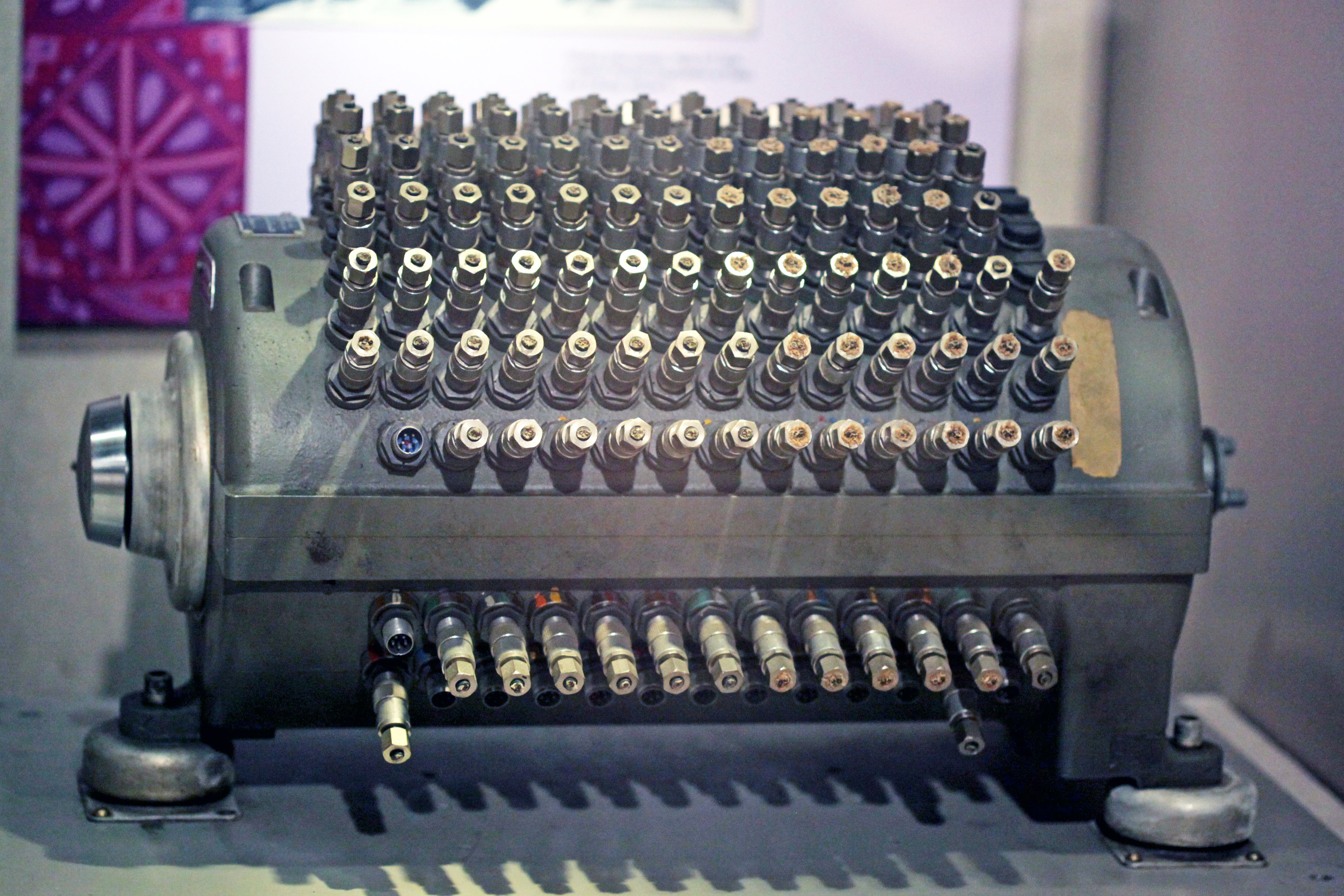
Memory drum of ILLIAC I, on display at the Spurlock Museum.

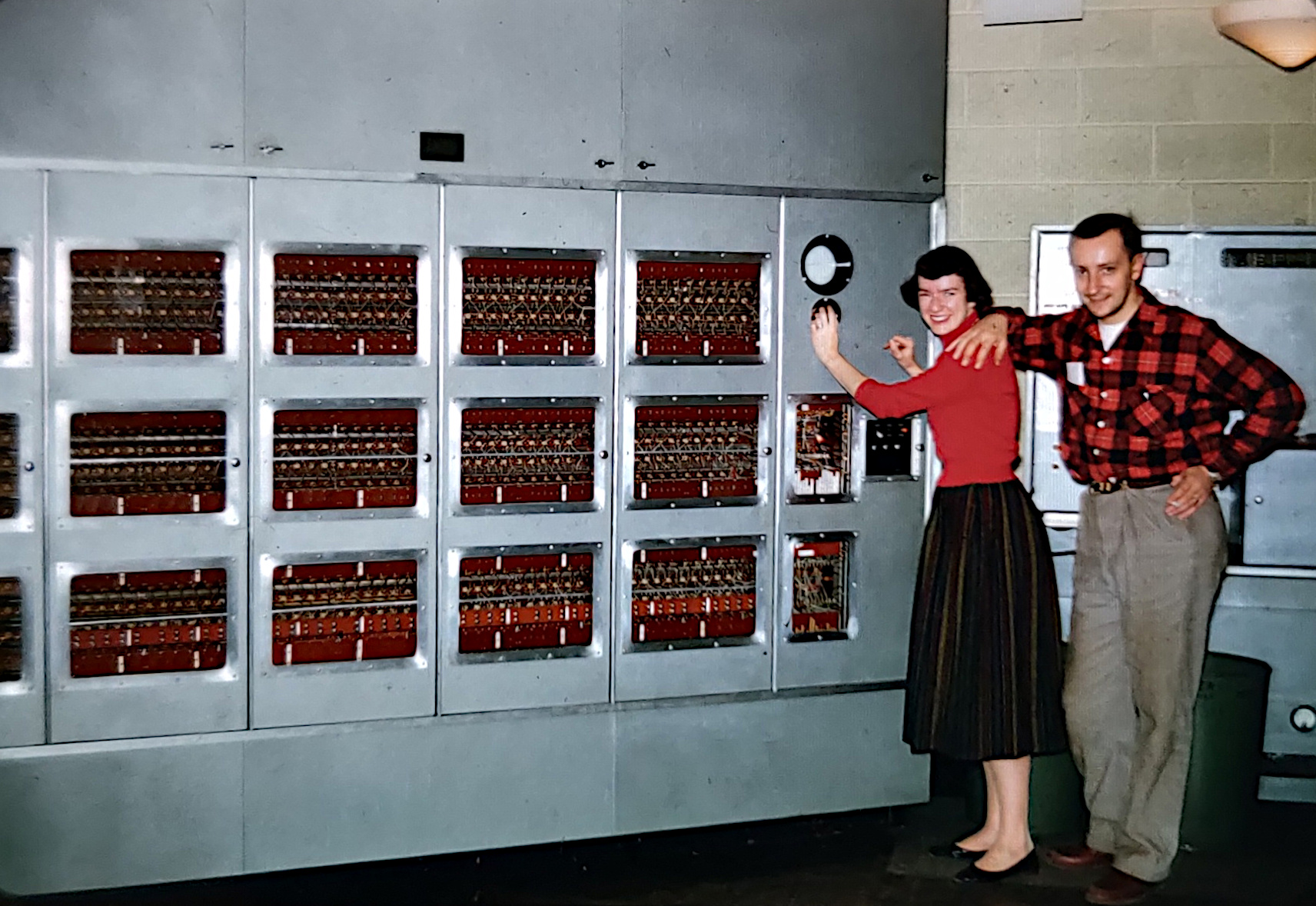
Alice (Betsy) E. D. Gillies and Donald B. Gillies with the ILLIAC I at the Digital Computer Lab, Urbana Illinois, circa 1958.

The ILLIAC I (Illinois Automatic Computer), a pioneering computer in the ILLIAC series of computers built in 1952 by the University of Illinois, was the first computer built and owned entirely by a United States educational institution.

== Computer ==
The project was the brainchild of Ralph Meagher and Abraham H. Taub, who were associated with Princeton's Institute for Advanced Study before coming to the University of Illinois. The ILLIAC I became operational on September 1, 1952. It was the second of two identical computers, the first of which was ORDVAC, also built at the University of Illinois. These two machines were the first pair of machines to run the same instruction set.

ILLIAC I was based on the IAS machine Von Neumann architecture as described by mathematician John von Neumann in his influential First Draft of a Report on the EDVAC. Unlike most computers of its era, the ILLIAC I and ORDVAC computers were twin copies of the same design, with software compatibility. The computer had 2,800 vacuum tubes, measured 10 ft (3 m) by 2 ft (0.6 m) by 8½ ft (2.6 m) (L×B×H), and weighed 4,000 pounds (2.0 short tons; 1.8 t). ILLIAC I was very powerful for its time; in 1956, it had more computing power than all of Bell Telephone Laboratories.

Because the lifetime of the tubes within ILLIAC was about a year, the machine was shut down every day for "preventive maintenance" when older vacuum tubes would be replaced in order to increase reliability. Visiting scholars from Japan assisted in the design of the ILLIAC series of computers, and later developed the MUSASINO-1 computer in Japan. ILLIAC I was retired in 1962, when the ILLIAC II became operational.

== Innovations ==
- 1955 – Lejaren Hiller and Leonard Isaacson used ILLIAC I to compose the Illiac Suite which was one of the first pieces of music to be written with the aid of a computer.
- 1957 – Mathematician Donald B. Gillies, physicist James E. Snyder, and astronomers George C. McVittie, S. P. Wyatt, Ivan R. King and George W. Swenson of the University of Illinois used the ILLIAC I computer to calculate the orbit of the Sputnik 1 satellite within two days of its launch.
- 1960 – The first version of the PLATO computer-based education system was implemented on the ILLIAC I by a team led by Donald Bitzer. It serviced a single user. In early 1961, version 2 of PLATO serviced two simultaneous users.

== See also ==
- ILLIAC II
- ILLIAC III
- ILLIAC IV
- MISTIC – Similar computer specifically inspired by ILLIAC I
- SILLIAC - Sydney version of the Illinois Automatic Computer, built by the University of Sydney
- List of vacuum-tube computers
