= SILLIAC =

Early computer built in Australia

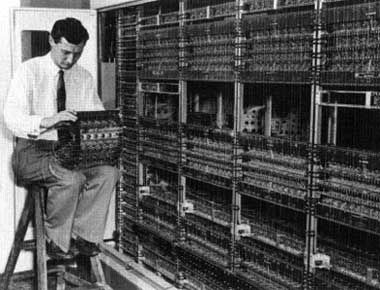
SILLIAC being serviced by Peter Aplin of Sydney University

The SILLIAC (Sydney version of the Illinois Automatic Computer, i.e. the Sydney ILLIAC), an early computer built by the University of Sydney, Australia, was based on the ILLIAC and ORDVAC computers developed at the University of Illinois.

Like other early computers, SILLIAC was physically large. The computer itself was a single large cabinet 2.5 m high, 3 m wide and 0.6 m deep in one room. Its power supply occupied a second room and air conditioning required an additional room in the basement.

It ran until May 17, 1968, when it was replaced by a faster and bigger machine. Although it was then broken up, some pieces of SILLIAC are at the Powerhouse Museum and others are displayed at Sydney University.

== History ==
SILLIAC had its genesis in late 1953 when Harry Messel, the dynamic new head of the School of Physics, and John Blatt, newly arrived researcher, both independently realised that the school needed an electronic computer as a tool for theoretical physics. Whilst the first computer in the southern hemisphere, the CSIR Mk 1, was already running elsewhere on the University of Sydney grounds, there were several serious impediments to its use by the School of Physics: The CSIR Mk 1 was fully occupied with CSIR research and John Blatt found its staff very unhelpful; and, as a serial architecture computer, it was far too slow for the sort of problems that Blatt and Messel envisaged. The solution was for the School to build its own computer.

Rather than design a computer from scratch, Blatt and Messel chose to copy the design of the ILLIAC for which the University of Illinois were happy to provide plans and assistance. John Algie, then maintenance engineer for CSIRAC, estimated the cost at AU£35,200, which was approximately ten times the cost of a Sydney suburban house at the time. Based on this, a decision to proceed was made at the end of 1953. A mutual friend introduced Messel to Adolph Basser, who donated AU£50,000 towards the computer. SILLIAC's eventual cost was AU£75,000.

In July 1954, Standard Telephones and Cables was contracted to build the computer, with testing and installation performed by technicians within the School of Physics.

SILLIAC's first scientific computation was carried out by PhD student Bob May (later Robert May, Baron May of Oxford) in June 1956, after self tests had been completed successfully. Another PhD student user in that month was John C. Butcher (later Professor of Mathematics at the University of Auckland),. Users were provided with regular access from July 9, with the official opening conducted on September 12.

Having abandoned its own computer system in 1955, CSIRO Division of Radiophysics in 1957 rented computing time on SILLIAC at a half-price rate of A$16,000 (equivalent to $567,749 in 2022) for 400 hours to perform analysis on data received by its equipment at Murrybank Field.

Barry de Ferranti, a pioneer involved in the construction of SILLIAC described the main cabinet of the computer as about 2 metres high, 1 metre deep and 5 metres long with glass panels at the front and light switches that indicated what was going on inside.

It ran until May 17, 1968, when it was replaced by a faster and bigger machine. SILLIAC has now been broken up into pieces with parts of it placed on display in the Chau Chak Wing Museum, which opened in November 2020.

== Hardware specifications ==
- Parallel, asynchronous operation. Approximately 13,000 additions, 1400 multipliplications or 1200 divisions per second
- Memory: 1024 words of 40 bits using 40 Williams tubes
- Two 20-bit instructions per word
- Approximately 150 operations on two registers
- Paper tape input at 200 characters per second (cps), paper tape output at about 50 cps or teleprinter output at 10 cps. Four magnetic tape units were added in 1958
- Initially 2768 valves. Increased to 2911 during 1958 upgrade
- Power consumption: 35 kW
- Average of 11 hours between failures

Like most of the IAS family, SILLIAC was not an exact copy of ILLIAC. One important change was the use of 2C51 valves in place of the more common 6J6. The 2C51 had been developed by Bell Labs for use in undersea telephone repeaters and had about 5 times the life (for 6 times the cost). This decision significantly improved the reliability of SILLIAC compared to its contemporaries.

== Conservation ==
Some pieces of SILLIAC are at the Powerhouse Museum and others are displayed at Sydney University. When it had been broken up, parts had originally been given to a range of people, including 14 schoolchildren who had requested the University for mementoes.

In March 2008, the Australian Computer Museum Society was seeking alternative storage, or risked its collection, including important components of SILLIAC, being scrapped.

In 2023 the Australian Computer Museum Society now has a venue for displaying the parts of SILLIAC that are in its collection.

== See also ==
- CSIR Mk 1, Sydney University's first computer
- List of vacuum-tube computers

== Sources ==
- Wendt, Harry; Orchiston, Wayne; Slee, Bruce (2011). "The Contribution of the Division of Radiophysics Murraybank Field to International Radio Astronomy". In Orchiston, Wayne; Nakamura, Tsuko; Strom, Richard G. (eds.). Highlighting the History of Astronomy in the Asia-Pacific Region: Proceedings of the ICOA-6 Conference. Springer Science & Business Media. ISBN 9781441981615.
- Deane, John (2010). "Connections in the history of Australian computing". In Tatnall, Arthur (ed.). History of Computing: Learning from the Past: IFIP WG 9.7 International Conference, HC 2010, Held as Part of WCC 2010, Brisbane, Australia, September 20–23, 2010, Proceedings. Springer. ISBN 9783642151996.
