= Division by infinity =

Mathematical problem

The hyperbola $y = 1/x$. As $x$ approaches ∞, $y$ approaches 0.

In mathematics, division by infinity is division where the divisor (denominator) is infinity. In ordinary arithmetic, this does not have a well-defined meaning, since ∞ is a mathematical concept that does not correspond to a specific number, and moreover, there is no nonzero real number that, when added to itself an infinite number of times, gives a finite number, unless you address the concept of indeterminate forms. However, "dividing by ∞" can be given meaning as an informal way of expressing the limit of dividing a number by larger and larger divisors.

Using mathematical structures that go beyond the real numbers, it is possible to define numbers that have infinite magnitude yet can still be manipulated in ways much like ordinary arithmetic. For example, on the extended real number line, dividing any real number by infinity yields zero, while in the surreal number system, dividing 1 by the infinite number $\omega$ yields the infinitesimal number $\epsilon$. In floating-point arithmetic, any finite number divided by $\pm\infty$ is equal to positive or negative zero if the numerator is finite. Otherwise, the result is NaN.

The challenges of providing a rigorous meaning of "division by infinity" are analogous to those of defining division by zero.

== Use in technology ==
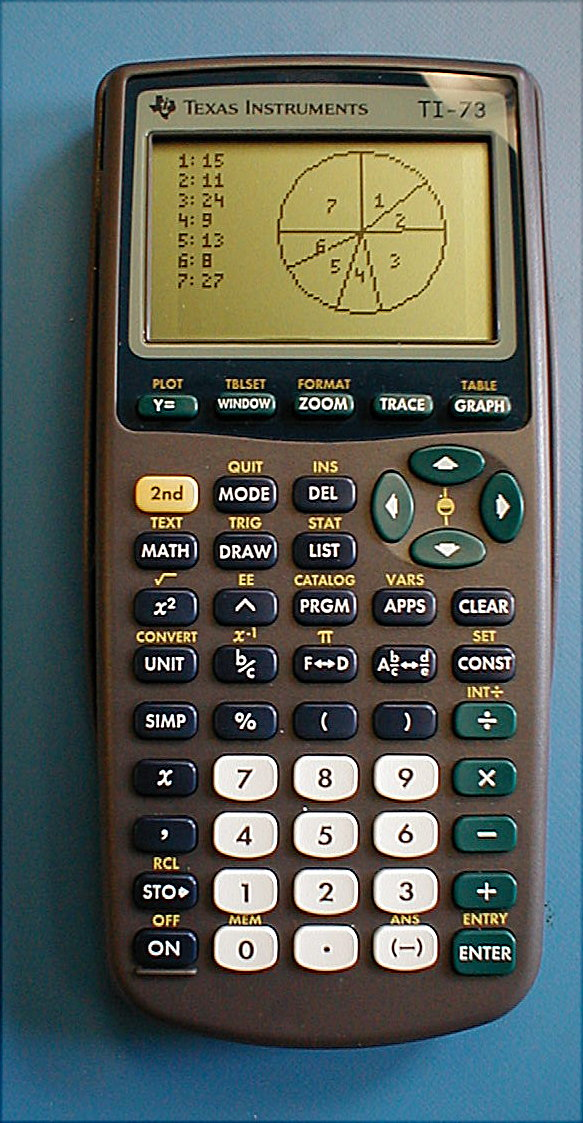
This calculator does not have an infinity button.

As infinity is difficult to deal with for most calculators and computers, many do not have a formal way of computing division by infinity. Calculators such as the TI-84 and most household calculators do not have an infinity button so it is impossible to type into the calculator 'x divided by infinity' so instead users can type a large number such as "1e99" ($1 \times 10^{99}$) or "-1e99". By typing in some number divided by a sufficiently large number the output will be 0. In some cases this fails as there is either an overflow error or if the numerator is also a sufficiently large number then the output may be 1 or a real number. In the Wolfram language, dividing an integer by infinity will result in the result 0. Also, in some calculators such as the TI-Nspire, 1 divided by infinity can be evaluated as 0.

== Use in calculus ==
=== Integration ===
In calculus, taking the integral of a function is defined finding the area under a curve. This can be done simply by breaking up this area into rectangular sections and taking the sum of these sections. These are called Riemann sums. As the sections get narrower, the Riemann sum becomes an increasingly accurate approximation of the true area. Taking the limit of these Riemann sums, in which the sections can be heuristically regarded as "infinitely thin", gives the definite integral of the function over the prescribed interval. Conceptually this results in dividing the interval by infinity to result in infinitely small pieces.

On a different note when taking an integral where one of the boundaries is infinity this is defined as an improper integral. To determine this one would take the limit as a variable an approaches infinity substituting a in for the infinity sign. This would then allow the integral to be evaluated and then the limit would be taken. In many cases evaluating this would result in a term being divided by infinity. In this case in order to evaluate the integral one would assume this to be zero. This allows for the integral to be assumed to converge meaning a finite answer can be determined from the integral using this assumption.

=== L'Hôpital's rule ===
When given a ratio between two functions, the limit of this ratio can be evaluated by computing the limit of each function separately. Where the limit of the function in the denominator is infinity, and the numerator does not allow the ratio to be well determined, the limit of the ratio is said to be of indeterminate form. An example of this is:

$$\frac{\infty}{\infty}$$

Using L'Hôpital's rule to evaluate limits of fractions where the denominator tends towards infinity can produce results other than 0.

If

$$\lim_{x\to c}\frac{f'(x)}{g'(x)}$$

then

$$\lim_{x\to c}\frac{f(x)}{g(x)} = \lim_{x\to c}\frac{f'(x)}{g'(x)}$$

So if

$$\lim_{x\to c}|f(x)| = \lim_{x\to c}|g(x)| = \infty,$$

then

$\lim_{x\to c}\frac{f(x)}{g(x)}=L$

This means that, when using limits to give meaning to division by infinity, the result of "dividing by infinity" does not always equal 0.
