= MISTIC =

1957 computer system at Michigan State University

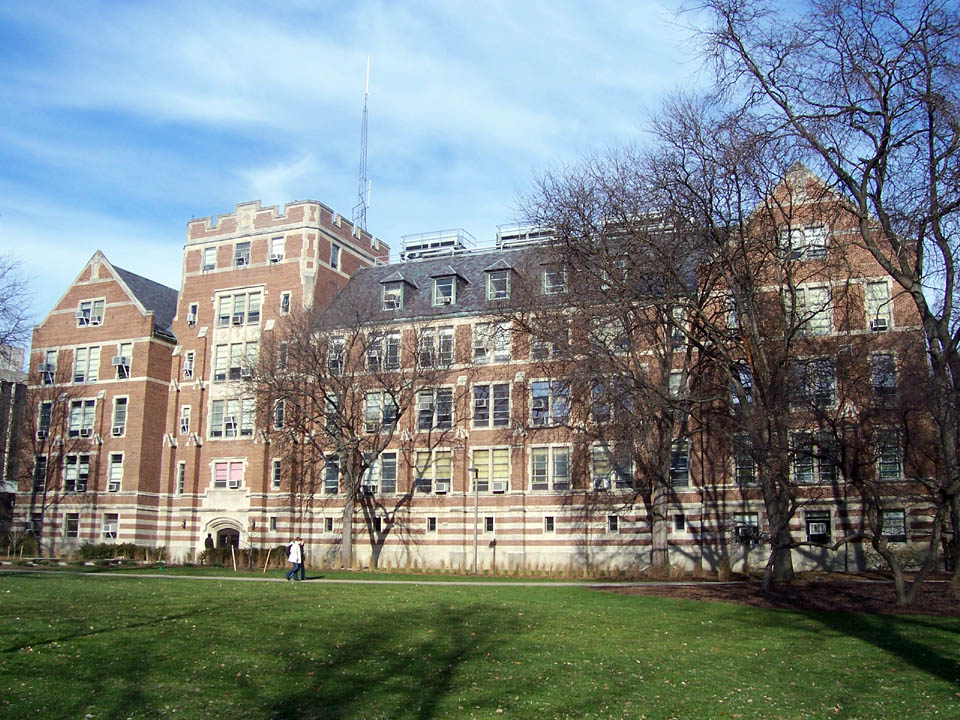
The Computer Center once housed the early computer MISTIC.

The MISTIC, or Michigan State Integral Computer, was the first computer system at Michigan State University and was built by its students, faculty and staff in 1957. Powered by vacuum tubes, its design was based on ILLIAC, the supercomputer built at University of Illinois at Urbana–Champaign, a descendant of the IAS architecture developed by John von Neumann.

== History ==
The interest in developing a computer system at Michigan State University (MSU) began several years before MISTIC was conceived. In 1954 when MSU was known as Michigan State College (MSC), Professor J. Sutherland Frame of the Mathematics department sent a proposal for a computer donation from the United States Army Aberdeen Proving Ground. Unfortunately, a federal agency won that donation and the computing vision was not realized at that time.

However, all hope was not lost. In April 1955, Dr. Frame, Dr. Kenneth Arnold, Dr. John Hofman, Francis Martin, Dr. George Swenson Jr., Dr. Lloyd Turk, and Dr. Charles Wells traveled to the University of Illinois to examine the ILLIAC, one of the few university-operated digital computers of its time. When they returned to MSU they made a recommendation to the university to build its own computing facility. The Board of Trustees and MSU president John A. Hannah quickly approved it. John Ryder, MSC's Dean of Engineering, former head of Electrical Engineering at University of Illinois had assisted in the construction of the ILLIAC, estimated that MSC could build their ILLIAC equivalent (including hiring two engineers) for $150,000.

== The MISTIC ==
Interests in designing MISTIC as the ILLIAC computer model at MSU was gaining attention from wide areas of academia within the United States, even as far as Iowa State University where electrical engineering Professor Dr. Lawrence Wayne Von Tersch originated. He came to MSU in March 1956 with the interest in the ILLIAC platform due to its large amount of statistical software available on paper tape. After a summer of study of the ILLIAC in Illinois, Dr. Von Tersch and three of his graduate students began building MISTIC in the fall of 1956.

Both ILLIAC and MISTIC were based on the Institute for Advanced Study's (IAS) computer, known for its revolutionary storage of data and instructions in the same memory. MISTIC and IAS consisted of five sections—input, memory, arithmetic processing, control, and output—setting the standard for at least twelve other computers later built.

MISTIC was built on the fifth floor, Room 500, of the Electrical Engineering Building, which today is the MSU Computer Center. Completed in the fall of 1957, the MISTIC weighed about one ton, filled the whole room, and was capable of storing 1,024 40-bit words (5 KB) in memory. Its anticipation sparked the establishment of the MSU Computer Laboratory in 1956 under the direction of Dr. Von Tersch. It was used in MSU's first computer course taught by computer coding professor Dr. Gerard Weeg. Departments from all over the MSU campus utilized the MISTIC for a myriad of courses and activities.

== The post-MISTIC era ==
MISTIC was the introduction of digital computing to the university, first step in the vast unexplored field. Computers with higher computational power followed within a few years. The vacuum-tube-based MISTIC was replaced by transistor-based Control Data Corporation (CDC) 3600 in 1963, CDC 6500 in 1968, CDC Cyber 170-750 in 1979 and many more down the years. MISTIC proved to be the cornerstone that changed the way faculty and students perceived computation. The university has owned many mainframes since MISTIC, but none has ever had as magical and inspirational effect as the one that was built on the fifth floor of the Electrical Engineering building, now the Computer Center.

== Facts about MISTIC ==
Facts from the exhibit MISTIC Memories: 50 Years of Computing at MSU, which ran from September 29, 2006 through March 31, 2007 at the Michigan State University Museum:

- MISTIC contained 2,610 vacuum tubes for processing and memory.
- Arithmetic Unit and Storage was in a cabinet that was 10 feet (3.0 m) high and 11 feet (3.4 m) long.
- Magnetic core memory was added in 1960, increasing the memory to 20K, roughly four times what the MISTIC began with.
- Computations were output on a Teletype printer at the rate of 10 characters per second.
- Card Reader could read punch cards at a rate of 200 cards per minute.

== See also ==
- List of vacuum tube computers
