= FUJIC =

First electronic digital computer in Japan

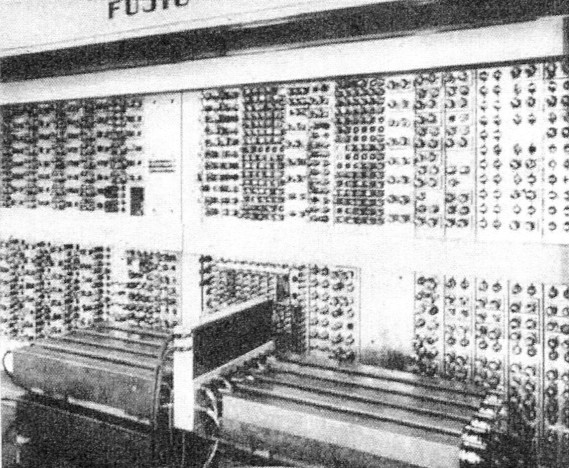
- Developer: Bunji Okazaki (ja:岡崎文次)
- Manufacturer: Fujifilm
- Type: Vacuum-tube computer
- Media: Input:Punched card, Output:Typewriter
- CPU: Original
- Memory: 255word×33bit (Mercury Delay-line memory)
- Power: 7kW

FUJIC was the first electronic digital computer in operation in Japan. It was finished in March 1956, the project having been effectively started in 1949, and was built almost entirely by Dr. Okazaki Bunji. Originally designed to perform calculations for lens design by Fuji, the ultimate goal of FUJIC's construction was to achieve a speed 1,000 times that of human calculation for the same purpose – the actual performance achieved was double that number.

Employing approximately 1,700 vacuum tubes, the computer's word length was 33 bits. It had an ultrasonic mercury delay-line memory of 255 words, with an average access time of 500 microseconds. An addition or subtraction was clocked at 100 microseconds, multiplication at 1,600 microseconds, and division at 2,100 microseconds.

Used extensively for two years at the Fuji factory in Odawara, it was given later to Waseda University before taking up residence in the National Science Museum of Japan in Tokyo.

== See also ==
- MUSASINO-1 – Early electronic digital computer built in Japan
- List of vacuum-tube computers – First generation programmable computers

== References and external links ==
- FUJIC at the IPSJ Computer Museum
- Dr. Okazaki Bunji at the IPSJ Computer Museum
- Raúl Rojas and Ulf Hashagen, ed. The First Computers: History and Architectures. 2000, MIT Press, ISBN 0-262-18197-5.
