= Information Trust Institute =

Research unit at the University of Illinois

- Established: 2004
- Field of research: Information security
- Director: David M. Nicol
- Location: Urbana, Illinois
- Affiliations: University of Illinois Urbana-Champaign
- Website: iti.illinois.edu

The Information Trust Institute (ITI) was founded in 2004 as an interdisciplinary unit designed to approach information security research from a systems perspective. It examines information security by looking at what makes machines, applications, and users trustworthy. Its mission is to create computer systems, software, and networks that society can depend on to be trustworthy, meaning secure, dependable (reliable and available), correct, safe, private, and survivable.

== Participants ==
ITI is an academic/industry partnership focusing on application areas such as electric power, financial systems, defense, and homeland security. It brings together over 100 researchers representing numerous colleges and units at the University of Illinois Urbana-Champaign.

=== Major centers within ITI ===
ITI is hosted at the campus of the University of Illinois Urbana-Champaign.

Other participants are based at:

- Boeing Trusted Software Center
- CAESAR: the Center for Autonomous Engineering Systems and Robotics
- the Center for Information Forensics
- Center for Health Information Privacy and Security
- the NSA Center for Information Assurance Education and Research
- TCIPG: the Trustworthy Cyber Infrastructure for the Power Grid Center
- Trusted Illiac, a hardware software cluster.

== Staff ==
Tim Yardley was ITI's associate director of technology.

== Funding ==
Funding of the institute is both from government agencies and corporations. It both receives and gives out grants.
