= MUSASINO-1 =

Early electronic digital computer built in Japan

The MUSASINO-1 was one of the earliest electronic digital computers built in Japan. Construction started at the Electrical Communication Laboratories of NTT at Musashino, Tokyo in 1952 and was completed in July 1957. The computer was used until July 1962. Saburo Muroga, a University of Illinois visiting scholar and member of the ILLIAC I team, returned to Japan and oversaw the construction of MUSASINO-1.

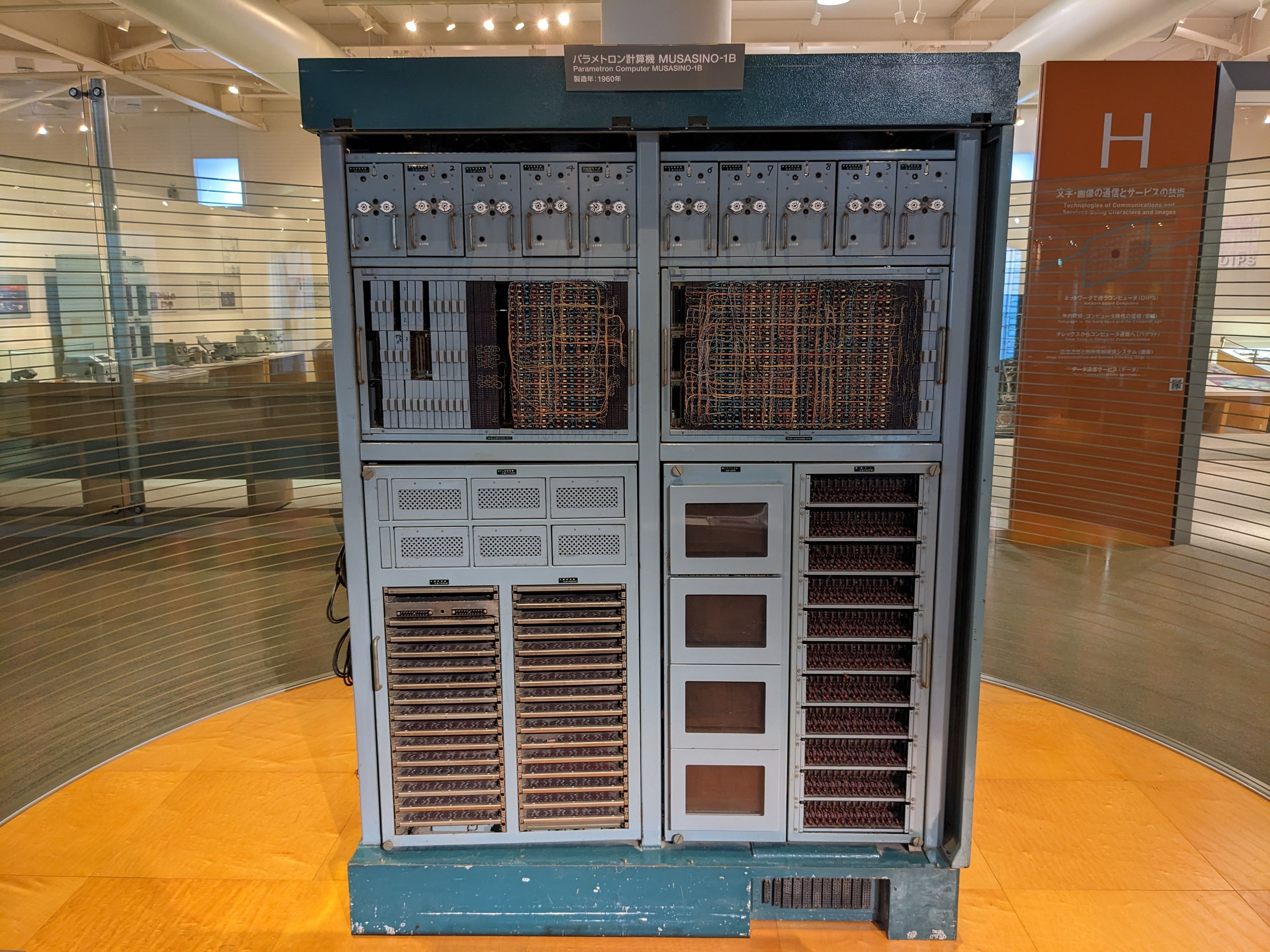
The MUSASINO-1B at the NTT Technical Museum in Musashino

Using 519 vacuum tubes and 5,400 parametrons, the MUSASINO-1 possessed a magnetic core memory, initially of 32 (later expanded to 256) words. A word was composed of 40 bits, and two instructions could be stored in a single word. Addition time was clocked at 1,350 microseconds, multiplication at 6,800 microseconds, and division time at 26.1 milliseconds.

The MUSASINO-1's instruction set was a superset of the ILLIAC I's instructions, so it could generally use the latter's software. However, many of the programs for the ILLIAC used some of the unused bits in the instructions to store data, and these would be interpreted as a different instructions by the MUSASINO-1 control circuitry.

== See also ==
- FUJIC – First electronic digital computer in Japan
- ILLIAC I – Vacuum tube computer built in 1952 by the University of Illinois
- List of vacuum-tube computers – First generation programmable computers
