= ILLIAC III =

Parallel computer built in 1966

The ILLIAC III was a fine-grained SIMD pattern recognition computer built by the University of Illinois in 1966.

This ILLIAC's initial task was image processing of bubble chamber experiments used to detect nuclear particles. Later it was used on biological images.

The machine was destroyed in a fire, caused by a Variac shorting on one of the wooden-top benches, in 1968. It was rebuilt in the early 1970s, and the core parallel-processing element of the machine, the Pattern Articulation Unit, was successfully implemented. In spite of this and the productive exploration of other advanced concepts, such as multiple-radix arithmetic, the project was eventually abandoned.

Bruce H. McCormick was the leader of the project throughout its history. John P. Hayes was responsible for the logic design of the input-output channel control units.

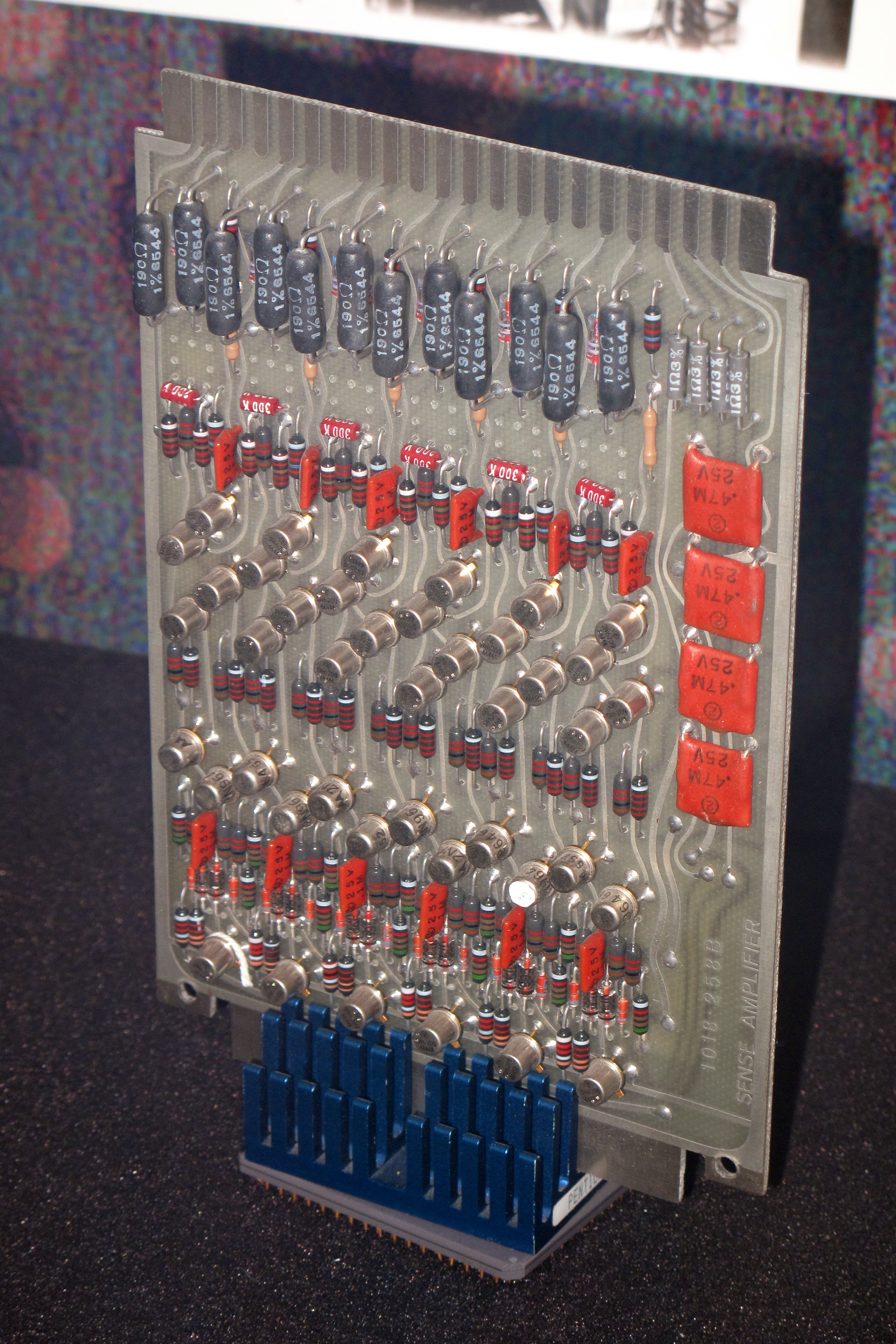

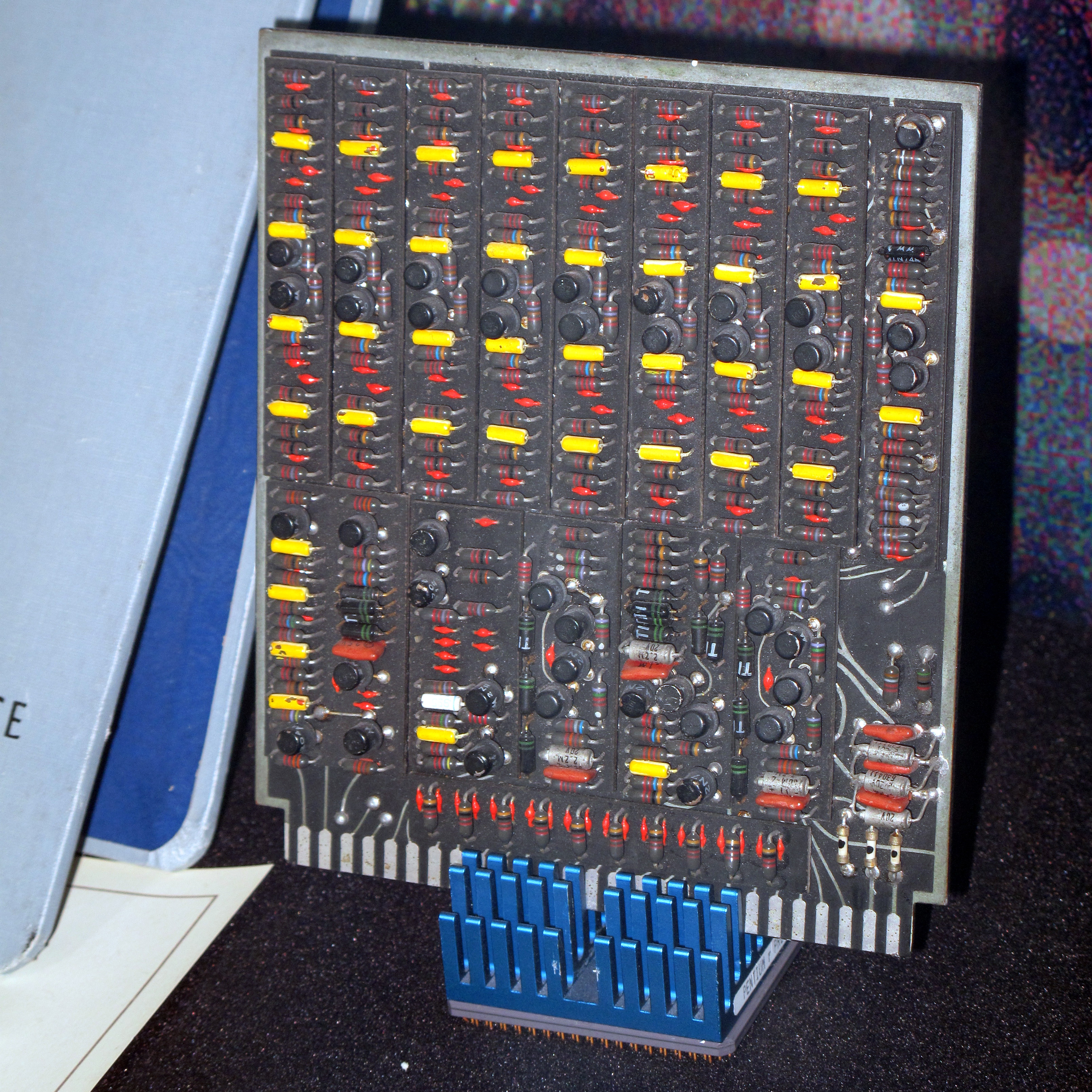
Printed circuits of the type used in ILLIAC III

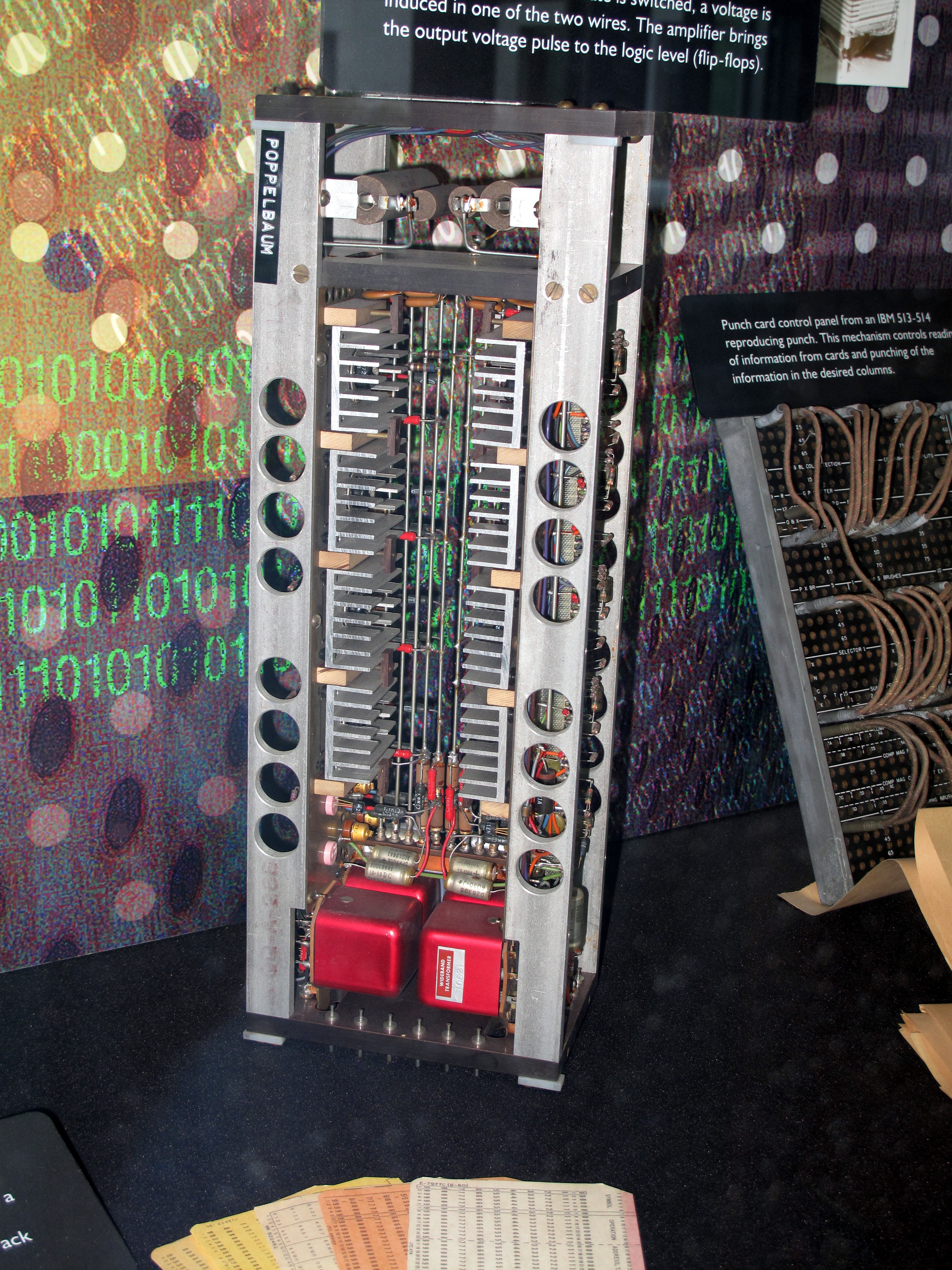
Printed circuits of the type used in ILLIAC III

== See also ==
- ORDVAC
- ILLIAC I
- ILLIAC II
- ILLIAC IV
