= Binade =

Interval of binary floating-point numbers with a common sign and exponent

The binade of exponent −2 in the floating-point numbers with 3 bits of precision and minimum exponent −5

In software engineering and numerical analysis, a binade is a set of numbers in a binary floating-point format that all have the same sign and exponent. In other words, a binade is the interval $[2^e, 2^{e + 1})$ or $(-2^{e + 1}, -2^e]$ for some integer value $e$, that is, the set of real numbers or floating-point numbers $x$ of the same sign such that $2^e \leq |x| < 2^{e + 1}$.

Some authors use the convention of the closed interval $[2^e, 2^{e + 1}]$ instead of a half-open interval, sometimes using both conventions in a single paper. Some authors additionally treat each of various special quantities such as NaN, infinities, and zeroes as its own binade, or similarly for the exceptional interval $(0, 2^{\mathrm{emin}})$ of subnormal numbers.
