= Double-precision floating-point format =

64-bit computer number format

Double-precision floating-point format (sometimes called FP64 or float64) is a floating-point number format, usually occupying 64 bits in computer memory; it represents a wide range of numeric values by using a floating radix point.

Double precision may be chosen when the range or precision of single precision would be insufficient.

In the IEEE 754 standard, the 64-bit base-2 format is officially referred to as binary64; it was called double in IEEE 754-1985. IEEE 754 specifies additional floating-point formats, including 32-bit base-2 single precision and, more recently, base-10 representations (decimal floating point).

One of the first programming languages to provide floating-point data types was Fortran. Before the widespread adoption of IEEE 754-1985, the representation and properties of floating-point data types depended on the computer manufacturer and computer model, and upon decisions made by programming-language implementers. E.g., GW-BASIC's double-precision data type was the 64-bit MBF floating-point format.

== IEEE 754 double-precision binary floating-point format: binary64 ==
Double-precision binary floating-point is a commonly used format on PCs, due to its wider range over single-precision floating point, in spite of its performance and bandwidth cost. It is commonly known simply as double. The IEEE 754 standard specifies a binary64 as having:

- Sign bit: 1 bit
- Exponent: 11 bits
- Significand precision: 53 bits (52 explicitly stored)

The sign bit determines the sign of the number (including when this number is zero, which is signed).

The exponent field is an 11-bit unsigned integer from 0 to 2047, in biased form: an exponent value of 1023 represents the actual zero. Exponents range from −1022 to +1023 because exponents of −1023 (all 0s) and +1024 (all 1s) are reserved for special numbers.

The 53-bit significand precision gives from 15 to 17 significant decimal digits precision (2^{−53} ≈ 1.11 × 10^{−16}). If a decimal string with at most 15 significant digits is converted to the IEEE 754 double-precision format, giving a normal number, and then converted back to a decimal string with the same number of digits, the final result should match the original string. If an IEEE 754 double-precision number is converted to a decimal string with at least 17 significant digits, and then converted back to double-precision representation, the final result must match the original number.

The format is written with the significand having an implicit integer bit of value 1 (except for special data, see the exponent encoding below). With the 52 bits of the fraction (F) significand appearing in the memory format, the total precision is therefore 53 bits (approximately 16 decimal digits, 53 log_{10}(2) ≈ 15.955). The bits are laid out as follows:

The real value assumed by a given 64-bit double-precision datum with a given biased exponent $E$ and a 52-bit fraction is

$$(-1)^{\text{sign}}(1.b_{51}b_{50}...b_{0})_2 \times 2^{E-1023}$$

or

$$(-1)^{\text{sign}}\left(1 + \sum_{i=1}^{52} b_{52-i} 2^{-i} \right)\times 2^{E-1023}$$

Between 2^{52}=4,503,599,627,370,496 and 2^{53}=9,007,199,254,740,992 the representable numbers are exactly the integers. For the next range, from 2^{53} to 2^{54}, everything is multiplied by 2, so the representable numbers are the even ones, etc. Conversely, for the previous range from 2^{51} to 2^{52}, the spacing is 0.5, etc.

The spacing as a fraction of the numbers in the range from 2^{n} to 2^{n+1} is 2^{n−52}. The maximum relative rounding error when rounding a number to the nearest representable one (the machine epsilon) is therefore 2^{−53}.

The 11 bit width of the exponent allows the representation of numbers between 10^{−308} and 10^{308}, with full 15–17 decimal digits precision. By compromising precision, the subnormal representation allows even smaller values up to about 5 × 10^{−324}.

=== Exponent encoding ===
The double-precision binary floating-point exponent is encoded using an offset-binary representation, with the zero offset being 1023; also known as exponent bias in the IEEE 754 standard. Examples of such representations would be:

e =00000000001_{2}=001_{16}=1:	$2^{1-1023}=2^{-1022}$	(smallest exponent for normal numbers)
e =01111111111_{2}=3ff_{16}=1023:	$2^{1023-1023}=2^0$	(zero offset)
e =10000000101_{2}=405_{16}=1029:	$2^{1029-1023}=2^6$
e =11111111110_{2}=7fe_{16}=2046:	$2^{2046-1023}=2^{1023}$	(highest exponent)

The exponents 000_{16} and 7ff_{16} have a special meaning:

- 00000000000_{2}=000_{16} is used to represent a signed zero (if F = 0) and subnormal numbers (if F ≠ 0); and
- 11111111111_{2}=7ff_{16} is used to represent ∞ (if F = 0) and NaNs (if F ≠ 0),

where F is the fractional part of the significand. All bit patterns are valid encoding.

Except for the above exceptions, the entire double-precision number is described by:

$$(-1)^{\text{sign}} \times 2^{e - 1023} \times 1.\text{fraction}$$

In the case of subnormal numbers (e = 0) the double-precision number is described by:

$$(-1)^{\text{sign}} \times 2^{1-1023} \times 0.\text{fraction} = (-1)^{\text{sign}} \times 2^{-1022} \times 0.\text{fraction}$$

=== Endianness ===
Although many processors use little-endian storage for all types of data (integer, floating point), there are a number of hardware architectures where floating-point numbers are represented in big-endian form while integers are represented in little-endian form. There are ARM processors that have mixed-endian floating-point representation for double-precision numbers: each of the two 32-bit words is stored as little-endian, but the most significant word is stored first. VAX floating point stores little-endian 16-bit words in big-endian order. Because there have been many floating-point formats with no network standard representation for them, the XDR standard uses big-endian IEEE 754 as its representation. It may therefore appear strange that the widespread IEEE 754 floating-point standard does not specify endianness. Theoretically, this means that even standard IEEE floating-point data written by one machine might not be readable by another. However, on modern standard computers (i.e., implementing IEEE 754), one may safely assume that the endianness is the same for floating-point numbers as for integers, making the conversion straightforward regardless of data type. Small embedded systems using special floating-point formats may be another matter, however.

=== Double-precision examples ===
  0 01111111111 00000000000000000000000000000000000000000000000000002
≙ 3FF0 0000 0000 000016
≙ +20 × 1
= 1

  0 01111111110 11111111111111111111111111111111111111111111111111112
≙ 3FEF FFFF FFFF FFFF16
≙ +2-1 × (2 - 2−52)
≈ 0.9999999999999998890 (the largest number less than 1)

  0 01111111111 00000000000000000000000000000000000000000000000000012
≙ 3FF0 0000 0000 000116
≙ +20 × (1 + 2−52)
≈ 1.0000000000000002220 (the smallest number greater than 1)

  0 01111111111 00000000000000000000000000000000000000000000000000102
≙ 3FF0 0000 0000 000216
≙ +20 × (1 + 2−51)
≈ 1.0000000000000004441 (the second smallest number greater than 1)

  0 10000000000 00000000000000000000000000000000000000000000000000002
≙ 4000 0000 0000 000016
≙ +21 × 1
= 2

  1 10000000000 00000000000000000000000000000000000000000000000000002
≙ C000 0000 0000 000016
≙ −21 × 1
= −2

  0 10000000000 10000000000000000000000000000000000000000000000000002
≙ 4008 0000 0000 000016
≙ +21 × 1.12
= 112
= 3

  0 10000000001 00000000000000000000000000000000000000000000000000002
≙ 4010 0000 0000 000016
≙ +22 × 1
= 1002
= 4

  0 10000000001 01000000000000000000000000000000000000000000000000002
≙ 4014 0000 0000 000016
≙ +22 × 1.012
= 1012
= 5

  0 10000000001 10000000000000000000000000000000000000000000000000002
≙ 4018 0000 0000 000016
≙ +22 × 1.12
= 1102
= 6

  0 10000000011 01110000000000000000000000000000000000000000000000002
≙ 4037 0000 0000 000016
≙ +24 × 1.01112
= 101112
= 23

  0 01111111000 10000000000000000000000000000000000000000000000000002
≙ 3F88 0000 0000 000016
≙ +2−7 × 1.12
= 0.000000112
= 0.01171875 (3/256)

  0 00000000000 00000000000000000000000000000000000000000000000000012
≙ 0000 0000 0000 000116
≙ +2−1022 × 2−52
= 2−1074
≈ 4.9406564584124654 × 10−324 (smallest positive subnormal number)

  0 00000000000 11111111111111111111111111111111111111111111111111112
≙ 000F FFFF FFFF FFFF16
≙ +2−1022 × (1 − 2−52)
≈ 2.2250738585072009 × 10−308 (largest subnormal number)

  0 00000000001 00000000000000000000000000000000000000000000000000002
≙ 0010 0000 0000 000016
≙ +2−1022 × 1
≈ 2.2250738585072014 × 10−308 (smallest positive normal number)

  0 11111111110 11111111111111111111111111111111111111111111111111112
≙ 7FEF FFFF FFFF FFFF16
≙ +21023 × (2 − 2−52)
≈ 1.7976931348623157 × 10308 (largest normal number)

  0 00000000000 00000000000000000000000000000000000000000000000000002
≙ 0000 0000 0000 000016
≙ +0 (positive zero)

  1 00000000000 00000000000000000000000000000000000000000000000000002
≙ 8000 0000 0000 000016
≙ −0 (negative zero)

  0 11111111111 00000000000000000000000000000000000000000000000000002
≙ 7FF0 0000 0000 000016
≙ +∞ (positive infinity)

  1 11111111111 00000000000000000000000000000000000000000000000000002
≙ FFF0 0000 0000 000016
≙ −∞ (negative infinity)

  0 11111111111 00000000000000000000000000000000000000000000000000012
≙ 7FF0 0000 0000 000116
≙ NaN (sNaN on most processors, such as x86 and ARM)

  0 11111111111 10000000000000000000000000000000000000000000000000012
≙ 7FF8 0000 0000 000116
≙ NaN (qNaN on most processors, such as x86 and ARM)

  0 11111111111 11111111111111111111111111111111111111111111111111112
≙ 7FFF FFFF FFFF FFFF16
≙ NaN (an alternative encoding of NaN)

  0 01111111101 01010101010101010101010101010101010101010101010101012
≙ 3FD5 5555 5555 555516
≙ +2−2 × (1 + 2−2 + 2−4 + ... + 2−52)
≈ 0.33333333333333331483 (closest approximation to 1/3)

  0 10000000000 10010010000111111011010101000100010000101101000110002
≙ 4009 21FB 5444 2D1816
≈ 3.141592653589793116 (closest approximation to π)

Encodings of qNaN and sNaN are not completely specified in IEEE 754 and depend on the processor. Most processors, such as the x86 family and the ARM family processors, use the most significant bit of the significand field to indicate a quiet NaN; this is what is recommended by IEEE 754. The PA-RISC processors use the bit to indicate a signaling NaN.

By default, ^{1}/_{3} rounds down, instead of up like single precision, because of the odd number of bits in the significand.

In more detail:

Given the hexadecimal representation 3FD5 5555 5555 555516,
  Sign = 0
  Exponent = 3FD16 = 1021
  Exponent Bias = 1023 (constant value; see above)
  Fraction = 5 5555 5555 555516
  Value = 2(Exponent − Exponent Bias) × 1.Fraction – Note that Fraction must not be converted to decimal here
        = 2−2 × (15 5555 5555 555516 × 2−52)
        = 2−54 × 15 5555 5555 555516
        = 0.333333333333333314829616256247390992939472198486328125
        ≈ 1/3

=== Execution speed with double-precision arithmetic ===
Using double-precision floating-point variables is usually slower than working with their single precision counterparts. One area of computing where this is a particular issue is parallel code running on GPUs. For example, when using Nvidia's CUDA platform, calculations with double precision can take, depending on hardware, from 2 to 32 times as long to complete compared to those done using single precision.

Additionally, many mathematical functions (e.g., sin, cos, atan2, log, exp and sqrt) need more computations to give accurate double-precision results, and are therefore slower.

=== Precision limitations on integer values ===
- Integers from −2^{53} to 2^{53} (−9,007,199,254,740,992 to 9,007,199,254,740,992) can be exactly represented.
- Integers between 2^{53} and 2^{54} = 18,014,398,509,481,984 round to a multiple of 2 (even number).
- Integers between 2^{54} and 2^{55} = 36,028,797,018,963,968 round to a multiple of 4.
- Integers between 2^{n} and 2^{n+1} round to a multiple of 2^{n−52}.

== Implementations ==
Doubles are implemented in many programming languages in different ways. On processors with only dynamic precision, such as x86 without SSE2 (or when SSE2 is not used, for compatibility purpose) and with extended precision used by default, software may have difficulties to fulfill some requirements.

=== C and C++ ===
C and C++ offer a wide variety of arithmetic types, such as std::float64_t in C++23 and _Float64 in C23, which are guaranteed to be the IEEE double-precision format, if they are present. Double precision is not required by the standards, even the latest ones (except by the optional annex F of C99, covering IEEE 754 arithmetic), but on most systems, the double type corresponds to double precision. However, on 32-bit x86 with extended precision by default, some compilers may not conform to the C standard or the arithmetic may suffer from double rounding.

=== Fortran ===
Fortran provides several integer and real types, and the 64-bit type real64, accessible via Fortran's intrinsic module iso_fortran_env, corresponds to double precision.

=== Common Lisp ===
Common Lisp provides the types SHORT-FLOAT, SINGLE-FLOAT, DOUBLE-FLOAT and LONG-FLOAT. Most implementations provide SINGLE-FLOATs and DOUBLE-FLOATs with the other types appropriate synonyms. Common Lisp provides exceptions for catching floating-point underflows and overflows, and the inexact floating-point exception, as per IEEE 754. No infinities and NaNs are described in the ANSI standard, however, several implementations do provide these as extensions.

=== Java ===
On Java before version 1.2, every implementation had to be IEEE 754 compliant. Version 1.2 allowed implementations to bring extra precision in intermediate computations for platforms like x87. Thus a modifier strictfp was introduced to enforce strict IEEE 754 computations. Strict floating point has been restored in Java 17.

=== JavaScript ===
As specified by the ECMAScript standard, all floating-point arithmetic in JavaScript shall be done using double-precision floating-point arithmetic.

=== JSON ===
The JSON data format supports numeric values, and it imposes no limits on their precision or range. However, RFC 8259 advises that, since IEEE 754 binary64 numbers are widely implemented, JSON processing implementations can achieve good interoperability if they expect no more precision or range than binary64 offers.

=== Rust and Zig ===
Rust and Zig have the f64 data type.
