= Standard Apple Numerics Environment =

Standard Apple Numerics Environment (SANE) was Apple Computer's software implementation of IEEE 754 floating-point arithmetic. It was available for the 6502-based Apple II and Apple III models and came standard with the 65816 based Apple IIGS and 680x0 based Macintosh and Lisa models. Later Macintosh models had hardware floating point arithmetic via 68040 microprocessors or 68881 floating point coprocessors, but still included SANE for compatibility with existing software.

SANE was replaced by Floating Point C Extensions access to hardware floating point arithmetic in the early 1990s as Apple switched from 680x0 to PowerPC microprocessors.
