= Subnormal number =

Denormalized floating-point numbers near zero

The non-negative half of a miniature floating-point system with a 2-bit mantissa (representing 1, 1¼, 1½ & 1¾) and a 2-bit exponent (representing ½, 1, & 2). With only normalized numbers (indicated in red) there are 12 possible values, plus zero. Augmentation with subnormal numbers (indicated in blue) extends the system's range near zero, albeit with some loss of precision.

In computer science, subnormal numbers are the subset of denormalized numbers (sometimes called denormals) that fill the underflow gap around zero in floating-point arithmetic. Any non-zero number with magnitude smaller than the smallest positive normal number is subnormal, while denormal can also refer to numbers outside that range. (Note: IEEE binary floating point only has subnormal denormals, because all numbers that aren't subnormal have an implicit leading 1 on the mantissa, ensuring that they are normal. All encodings that use more than one bit per digit will have some denormals outside any subnormal range; for example, all IEEE decimal floating point encodings have 4 bits per digit, allowing the leading digit to be 0 for any exponent value.)

== Terminology ==
In some older documents (especially standards documents such as the initial release of IEEE 754 (1985) and the first standard version of the C language (1989)), "denormal" is used to refer exclusively to subnormal numbers. This usage persists in various standards documents, especially when discussing hardware that is incapable of representing any other denormalized numbers, but the discussion here uses the term "subnormal" in line with the 2008 revision of IEEE 754. In casual discussions, the terms subnormal and denormal are often used interchangeably, in part because there are no denormalized IEEE binary numbers outside the subnormal range.

The term "number" is used rather loosely, to describe a particular sequence of digits, rather than a mathematical abstraction; see Floating-point arithmetic for details of how real numbers relate to floating-point representations. "Representation" rather than "number" may be used when clarity is required.

Sometimes it is useful to treat zero as one of the subnormal numbers, as its binary representation typically matches this interpretation; at other times it may be useful to contrast zero from (other) subnormal numbers, since all floating point number systems must have a way of representing zero, even if they don't otherwise have subnormal numbers.

== Definition ==
Mathematical real numbers may be approximated by multiple floating-point representations. One representation is defined as normal, and others are defined as subnormal, denormal, or unnormal by their relationship to normal.

In a normal floating-point value, there are no leading zeros in the significand (also commonly called mantissa); rather, leading zeros are removed by adjusting the exponent (for example, the number 0.0123 would be written as 1.23×10^{−2}). Conversely, a denormalized floating-point value has a significand with a leading digit of zero. Of these, the subnormal numbers represent values which if normalized would have exponents below the smallest representable exponent (the exponent having a limited range).

The significand (or mantissa) of an IEEE floating-point number is the part of a floating-point number that represents the significant digits. For a positive normalised number, it can be represented as m_{0}.m_{1}m_{2}m_{3}...m_{p−2}m_{p−1} (where m represents a significant digit, and p is the precision) with non-zero m_{0}. Notice that for a binary radix, the leading binary digit is always 1. In a subnormal number, since the exponent is the least that it can be, zero is the leading significant digit (0.m_{1}m_{2}m_{3}...m_{p−2}m_{p−1}), allowing the representation of numbers closer to zero than the smallest normal number. A floating-point number may be recognized as subnormal whenever its exponent has the least possible value.

By filling the underflow gap like this, significant digits are lost, but not as abruptly as when using the flush to zero on underflow approach (discarding all significant digits when underflow is reached). Hence the production of a subnormal number is sometimes called gradual underflow because it allows a calculation to lose precision slowly when the result is small.

In IEEE 754-2008, subnormal numbers are supported in both binary and decimal formats. In binary interchange formats, subnormal numbers are encoded with a biased exponent of 0, but are interpreted with the value of the smallest allowed exponent, which is one greater (i.e., as if it were encoded as a 1). In decimal interchange formats they require no special encoding because the format supports unnormalized numbers directly.

Mathematically speaking, the normalized floating-point numbers of a given sign are roughly logarithmically spaced, and as such any finite-sized normal float cannot include zero. The subnormal floats are a linearly spaced set of values, which span the gap between the negative and positive normal floats.

== Background ==
Subnormal numbers provide the guarantee that addition and subtraction of floating-point numbers never underflows; two nearby floating-point numbers always have a representable non-zero difference. Without gradual underflow, the subtraction a − b can underflow and produce zero even though the values are not equal. This can, in turn, lead to division by zero errors that cannot occur when gradual underflow is used.

Subnormal numbers were implemented in the Intel 8087 while the IEEE 754 standard was being written. They were by far the most controversial feature in the K-C-S format proposal that was eventually adopted, but this implementation demonstrated that subnormal numbers could be supported in a practical implementation. Some implementations of floating-point units do not directly support subnormal numbers in hardware, but rather trap to some kind of software support. While this may be transparent to the user, it can result in calculations that produce or consume subnormal numbers being much slower than similar calculations on normal numbers.

== IEEE ==
In IEEE binary floating-point formats, subnormals are represented by having a zero exponent field with a non-zero significand field. In this standard, the existence of subnormal numbers allows the representations of some non-zero values with absolute value from $2^{-149}$ to $(2^{-126} - 2^{-149})$ for binary32, and from $2^{-1074}$ to $(2^{-1022} - 2^{-1074})$ for binary64.

No other denormalized numbers exist in the IEEE binary floating-point formats, but they do exist in some other formats, including the IEEE decimal floating-point formats.

== Performance issues ==
Some systems handle subnormal values in hardware, in the same way as normal values. Others leave the handling of subnormal values to system software ("assist"), only handling normal values and zero in hardware. Handling subnormal values in software always leads to a significant decrease in performance. When subnormal values are entirely computed in hardware, implementation techniques exist to allow their processing at speeds comparable to normal numbers. However, the speed of computation remains significantly reduced on many modern x86 processors; in extreme cases, instructions involving subnormal operands may take as many as 100 additional clock cycles, causing the fastest instructions to run as much as six times slower.

This speed difference can be a security risk. Researchers showed that it provides a timing side channel that allows a malicious web site to extract page content from another site inside a web browser.

Some applications need to contain code to avoid subnormal numbers, either to maintain accuracy, or in order to avoid the performance penalty in some processors. For instance, in audio processing applications, subnormal values usually represent a signal so quiet that it is out of the human hearing range. Because of this, a common measure to avoid subnormals on processors where there would be a performance penalty is to cut the signal to zero once it reaches subnormal levels or mix in an extremely quiet noise signal. Other methods of preventing subnormal numbers include adding a DC offset, quantizing numbers, adding a Nyquist signal, etc. Since the SSE2 processor extension, Intel has provided such a functionality in CPU hardware, which rounds subnormal numbers to zero.

== Disabling subnormal floats at the code level ==
=== Intel SSE ===
Intel's C and Fortran compilers enable the DAZ (denormals-are-zero) and FTZ (flush-to-zero) flags for SSE by default for optimization levels higher than -O0. The effect of DAZ is to treat subnormal input arguments to floating-point operations as zero, and the effect of FTZ is to return zero instead of a subnormal float for operations that would result in a subnormal float, even if the input arguments are not themselves subnormal. Clang and GCC have varying default states depending on platform and optimization level.

A non-C99-compliant method of enabling the DAZ and FTZ flags on targets supporting SSE is given below, but is not widely supported. It is known to work on Mac OS X since at least 2006.

#include <fenv.h>
#pragma STDC FENV_ACCESS ON
// Sets DAZ and FTZ, clobbering other CSR settings.
fesetenv(FE_DFL_DISABLE_SSE_DENORMS_ENV);
// fesetenv(FE_DFL_ENV) // Disable both, clobbering other CSR settings.

For other x86-SSE platforms where the C library has not yet implemented this flag, the following may work:

#include <xmmintrin.h>
_mm_setcsr(_mm_getcsr() | 0x0040);  // DAZ
_mm_setcsr(_mm_getcsr() | 0x8000);  // FTZ
_mm_setcsr(_mm_getcsr() | 0x8040);  // Both
_mm_setcsr(_mm_getcsr() & ~0x8040); // Disable both

The _MM_SET_DENORMALS_ZERO_MODE and _MM_SET_FLUSH_ZERO_MODE macros wrap a more readable interface for the code above.

// To enable DAZ
#include <pmmintrin.h>
_MM_SET_DENORMALS_ZERO_MODE(_MM_DENORMALS_ZERO_ON);
// To enable FTZ
#include <xmmintrin.h>
_MM_SET_FLUSH_ZERO_MODE(_MM_FLUSH_ZERO_ON);

Most compilers will already provide the previous macro by default, otherwise the following code snippet can be used (the definition for FTZ is analogous):

#define _MM_DENORMALS_ZERO_MASK   0x0040
#define _MM_DENORMALS_ZERO_ON     0x0040
#define _MM_DENORMALS_ZERO_OFF    0x0000

#define _MM_SET_DENORMALS_ZERO_MODE(mode) _mm_setcsr((_mm_getcsr() & ~_MM_DENORMALS_ZERO_MASK) | (mode))
#define _MM_GET_DENORMALS_ZERO_MODE()                (_mm_getcsr() &  _MM_DENORMALS_ZERO_MASK)

The default denormalization behavior is mandated by the ABI, and therefore well-behaved software should save and restore the denormalization mode before returning to the caller or calling code in other libraries.

=== ARM ===
On ARM architectures, handling of subnormal floating-point numbers depends on the floating-point unit configuration, with some implementations supporting gradual underflow in hardware while others default to flush-to-zero behavior for performance reasons.

AArch32 NEON (SIMD) FPU always uses a flush-to-zero mode, which is the same as FTZ + DAZ. For the scalar FPU and in the AArch64 SIMD, the flush-to-zero behavior is optional and controlled by the FZ bit of the control register – FPSCR in Arm32 and FPCR in AArch64.

One way to do this can be:

#if defined(__arm64__) || defined(__aarch64__)
    uint64_t fpcr;
    asm( "mrs %0,   fpcr" : "=r"( fpcr ));             //Load the FPCR register
    asm( "msr fpcr, %0"   :: "r"( fpcr | (1 << 24) )); //Set the 24th bit (FTZ) to 1
#endif

Some ARM processors have hardware handling of subnormals.

== See also ==
- Logarithmic number system
- IEEE 754-1985 § Denormalized numbers
