= IEEE 854-1987 =

IEEE standard for radix-independent floating-point arithmetic

The IEEE Standard for Radix-Independent Floating-Point Arithmetic (IEEE 854), was the first Institute of Electrical and Electronics Engineers (IEEE) international standard for floating-point arithmetic with radices other than 2, including radix 10. IEEE 854 did not specify any data formats, whereas IEEE 754-1985 did specify formats for binary (radix 2) floating point. IEEE 754-1985 and IEEE 854-1987 were both superseded in 2008 by IEEE 754-2008, which specifies floating-point arithmetic for both radix 2 (binary) and radix 10 (decimal), and specifies two alternative formats for radix 10 floating-point values, and even more so with IEEE 754-2019. IEEE 754-2008 also had many other updates to the IEEE floating-point standardisation.

IEEE 854 arithmetic was first commercially implemented in the HP-71B handheld computer, which used decimal floating point with 12 digits of significand, and an exponent range of ±499, with a 15 digit significand used for intermediate results.
