= AMD Instinct =

Brand of data center GPUs by AMD

- Release date: June 20, 2017; 9 years ago
- Designed by: AMD
- Marketed by: AMD
- Architecture: GCN 3; GCN 4; GCN 5; CDNA; CDNA 2; CDNA 3
- Models: MI Series
- Cores: 36-304 Compute Units (CUs)
- Transistors: 5.7B (Polaris10) 14 nm; 8.9B (Fiji) 28 nm; 12.5B (Vega10) 14 nm; 13.2B (Vega20) 7 nm; 25.6B (Arcturus) 7 nm; 58.2B (Aldebaran) 6 nm; 146B (Antares) 5 nm; 153B (Aqua Vanjaram) 5 nm; 185B (CDNA4) 4 nm

History
- Predecessor: AMD FirePro; Radeon Sky series

AMD Instinct is AMD's brand of data center GPUs. It replaced AMD's FirePro S brand in 2016. Compared to the Radeon brand of mainstream consumer/gamer products, the Instinct product line is intended to accelerate deep learning, artificial neural network, and high-performance computing/GPGPU applications.

The AMD Instinct product line directly competes with Nvidia's Tesla (Nvidia Data Center GPUs) and Intel's Xeon Phi and Data Center GPU lines of machine learning and GPGPU cards.

The brand was originally known as AMD Radeon Instinct, but AMD dropped the Radeon brand from the name before AMD Instinct MI100 was introduced in November 2020.

In June 2022, supercomputers based on AMD's Epyc CPUs and Instinct GPUs took the lead on the Green500 list of the most power-efficient supercomputers with over 50% lead over any other, and held the top first 4 spots. One of them, the AMD-based Frontier is since June 2022 and as of 2023 the fastest supercomputer in the world on the TOP500 list.

== Products ==
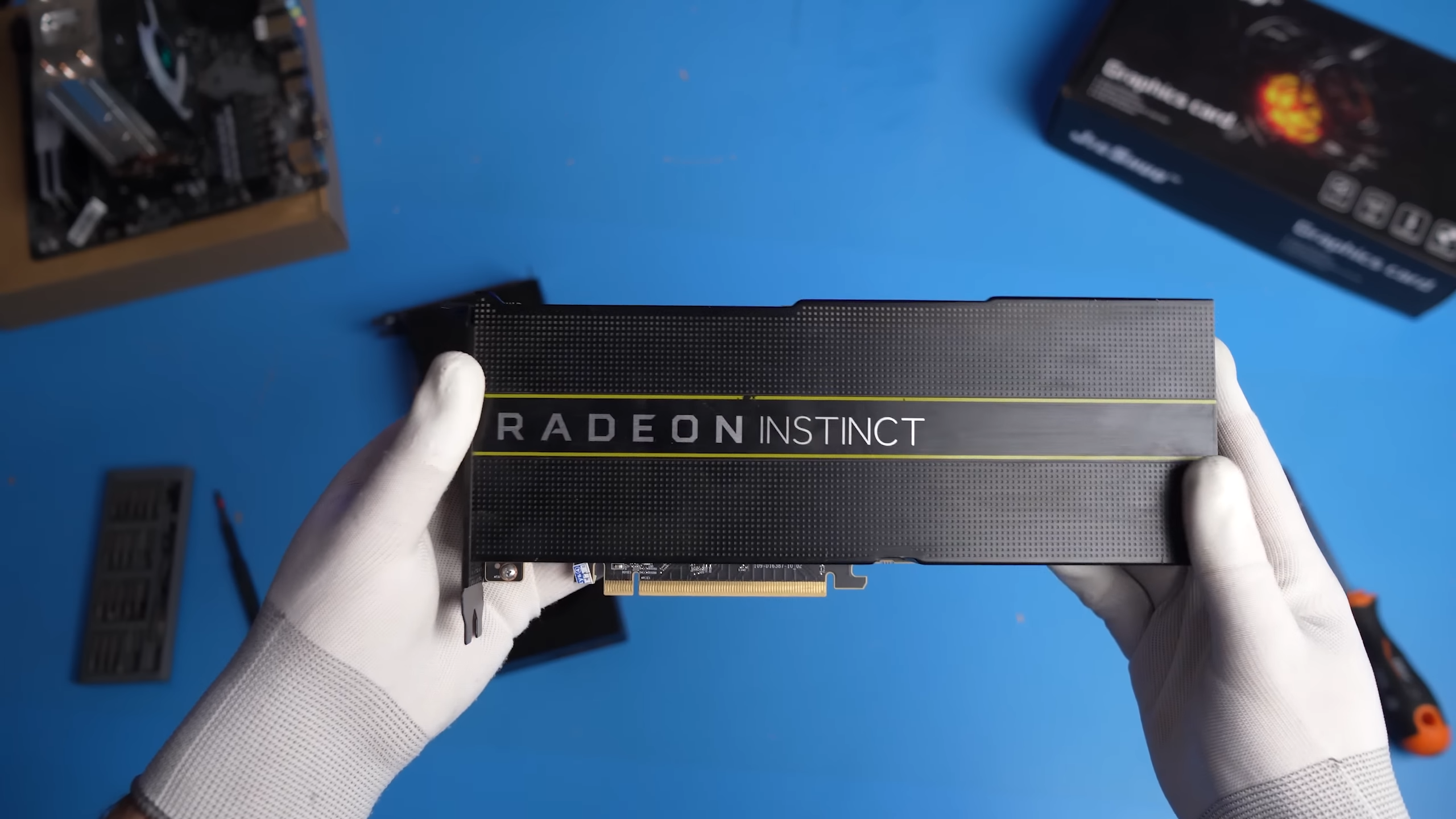
Top view of an AMD Radeon Instinct MI50 card

The three initial Radeon Instinct products were announced on December 12, 2016, and released on June 20, 2017, with each based on a different architecture.

=== MI6 ===
The MI6 is a passively cooled, Polaris 10 based card with 16 GB of GDDR5 memory and with a <150 W TDP. At 5.7 TFLOPS (FP16 and FP32), the MI6 is expected to be used primarily for inference, rather than neural network training. The MI6 has a peak double precision (FP64) compute performance of 358 GFLOPS.

=== MI8 ===
The MI8 is a Fiji based card, analogous to the R9 Nano, has a <175W TDP. The MI8 has 4 GB of High Bandwidth Memory. At 8.2 TFLOPS (FP16 and FP32), the MI8 is marked toward inference. The MI8 has a peak (FP64) double precision compute performance 512 GFLOPS.

=== MI25 ===
The MI25 is a Vega based card, utilizing HBM2 memory. The MI25 performance is expected to be 12.3 TFLOPS using FP32 numbers. In contrast to the MI6 and MI8, the MI25 is able to increase performance when using lower precision numbers, and accordingly is expected to reach 24.6 TFLOPS when using FP16 numbers. The MI25 is rated at <300W TDP with passive cooling. The MI25 also provides 768 GFLOPS peak double precision (FP64) at 1/16th rate.

=== MI50, MI60 ===
MI50 and MI60 are based on the Vega20 variant of GCN 5. They support 1/2 rate FP64 and are the last Instinct cards to bear the Radeon branding as well as the ability to produce display output.

=== MI100 series (CDNA 1) ===
The CDNA1 cards have removed all rendering-related resources while adding matrix processing units.

=== MI300 series ===
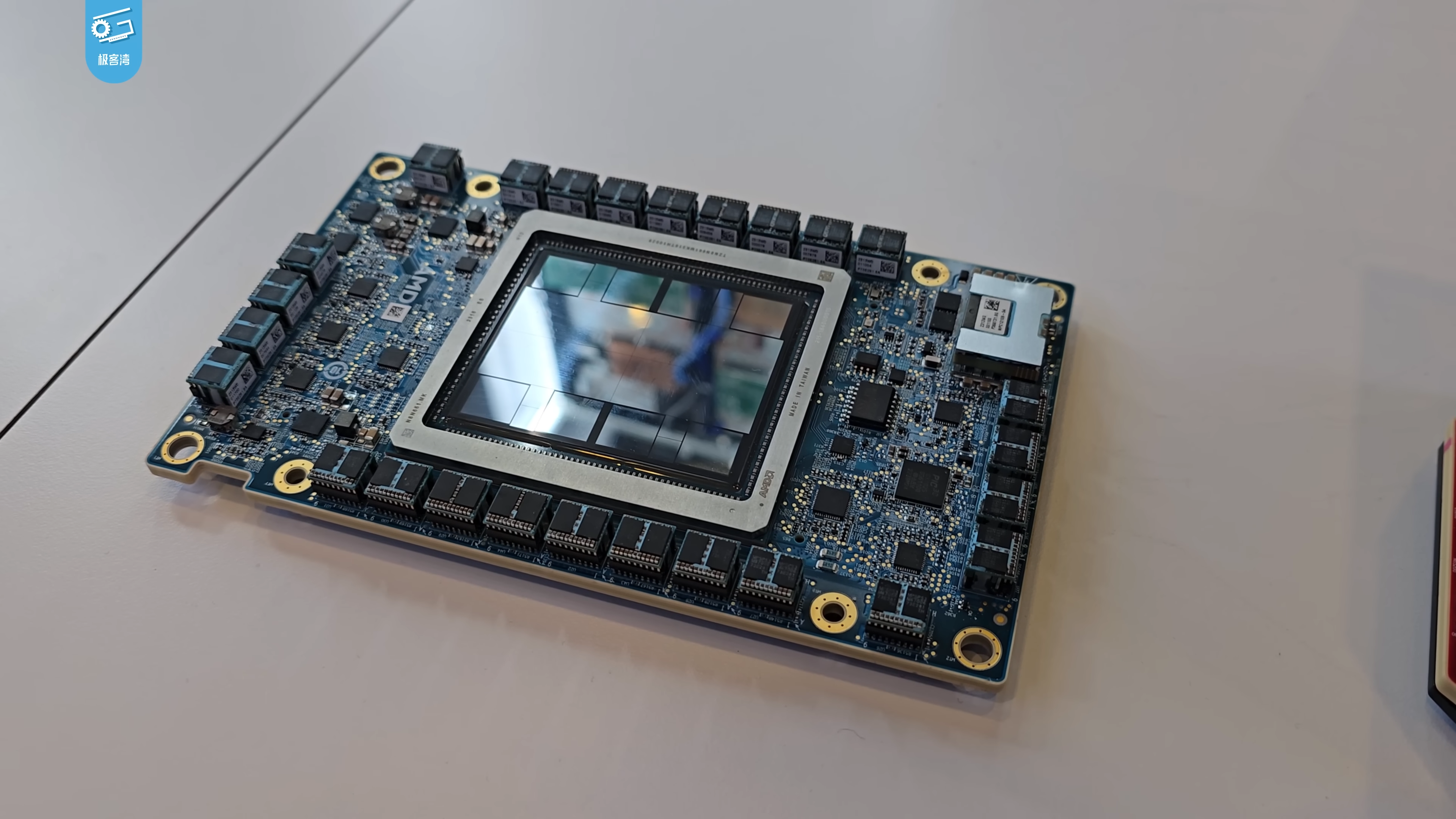
The AMD Instinct MI325X without cooler

The MI300A and MI300X are data center accelerators that use the CDNA 3 architecture, which is optimized for high-performance computing (HPC) and generative artificial intelligence (AI) workloads. The CDNA 3 architecture features a scalable chiplet design that leverages TSMC’s advanced packaging technologies, such as CoWoS (chip-on-wafer-on-substrate) and InFO (integrated fan-out), to combine multiple chiplets on a single interposer. The chiplets are interconnected by AMD’s Infinity Fabric, which enables high-speed and low-latency data transfer between the chiplets and the host system.

The MI300A is an accelerated processing unit (APU) that integrates 24 Zen 4 CPU cores with four CDNA 3 GPU cores, resulting in a total of 228 CUs in the GPU section, and 128 GB of HBM3 memory. The Zen 4 CPU cores are based on the 5 nm process node and support the x86-64 instruction set, as well as AVX-512 and BFloat16 extensions. The Zen 4 CPU cores can run general-purpose applications and provide host-side computation for the GPU cores. The MI300A has a peak performance of 61.3 TFLOPS of FP64 (122.6 TFLOPS FP64 matrix) and 980.6 TFLOPS of FP16 (1961.2 TFLOPS with sparsity), as well as 5.3 TB/s of memory bandwidth. The MI300A supports PCIe 5.0 and CXL 2.0 interfaces, which allow it to communicate with other devices and accelerators in a heterogeneous system.

The MI300X is a dedicated generative AI accelerator that replaces the CPU cores with additional GPU cores and HBM memory, resulting in a total of 304 CUs (64 cores per CU) and 192 GB of HBM3 memory. The MI300X is designed to accelerate generative AI applications, such as natural language processing, computer vision, and deep learning. The MI300X has a peak performance of 653.7 TFLOPS of TP32 (1307.4 TFLOPS with sparsity) and 1307.4 TFLOPS of FP16 (2614.9 TFLOPS with sparsity), as well as 5.3 TB/s of memory bandwidth. The MI300X also supports PCIe 5.0 and CXL 2.0 interfaces, as well as AMD’s ROCm software stack, which provides a unified programming model and tools for developing and deploying generative AI applications on AMD hardware.

=== MI350 series ===
The MI350X and MI355X are data center accelerators built on the CDNA 4 architecture, targeting advanced AI training and inference workloads. Manufactured on TSMC’s 3 nm (N3) process, they incorporate a high-performance chiplet design, feature 288 GB of HBM3E memory with 8 TB/s of bandwidth. CDNA 4 introduces native support for low-precision formats FP4 and FP6, in addition to FP8 and FP16—boosting FP4 compute to up to 9.2 PetaFLOPS on the MI355X. The architecture maintains AMD’s Infinity Fabric interconnect for high-speed, low-latency data transit between GPU chiplets and the host system. This design builds on CDNA 3, advancing both scalability and energy efficiency for large-scale AI deployments. In 2026, AMD released the MI350P as a PCIe card with approximately half the compute capacity and power requirements of the MI350X.

== Software ==
=== ROCm ===
Following software is, as of 2022, regrouped under the Radeon Open Compute meta-project.

==== MxGPU ====
The MI6, MI8, and MI25 products all support AMD's MxGPU virtualization technology, enabling sharing of GPU resources across multiple users.

==== MIOpen ====
MIOpen is AMD's deep learning library to enable GPU acceleration of deep learning. Much of this extends the GPUOpen's Boltzmann Initiative software. This is intended to compete with the deep learning portions of Nvidia's CUDA library. It supports the deep learning frameworks: Theano, Caffe, TensorFlow, MXNet, Microsoft Cognitive Toolkit, Torch, and Chainer. Programming is supported in OpenCL and Python, in addition to supporting the compilation of CUDA through AMD's Heterogeneous-compute Interface for Portability and Heterogeneous Compute Compiler.

== Chipset table ==
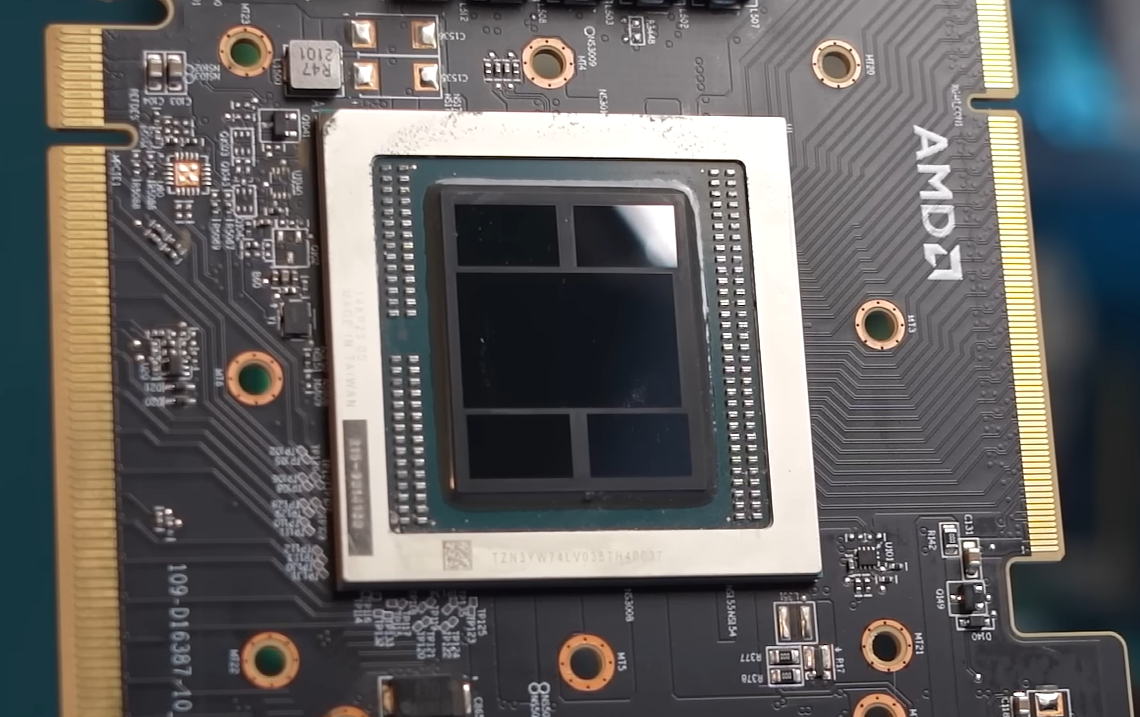
The Vega 20 GPU on the Instinct MI50

AMD Radeon Instinct GPUs (has render output, no matrix units)
Model (Code name)	Launch	Architecture & fab	LLVM target	Transistors & die size	Core		Fillrate (Note: Boost values (if available) are stated below the base value in italic.) (Note: Texture fillrate is calculated as the number of texture mapping units multiplied by the base (or boost) core clock speed.) (Note: Pixel fillrate is calculated as the number of render output units multiplied by the base (or boost) core clock speed.)		Vector TFLOPS (Note: Precision performance is calculated from the base (or boost) core clock speed based on a FMA operation.)			Memory				TBP	Bus interface
Model (Code name)	Launch	Architecture & fab	LLVM target	Transistors & die size	Config (Note: Unified shaders : Texture mapping units : Render output units and Compute units (CU))	Clock (MHz)	Texture (GT/s)	Pixel (GP/s)	FP16	FP32	FP64	Size (GB)	Bus type & width	Bandwidth (GB/s)	Clock (MT/s)	TBP	Bus interface
Radeon Instinct MI6 (Polaris 10)	Jun 20, 2017	GCN 4 GloFo 14LP	gfx803	5.7×10^{9} 232 mm^{2}	2304:144:32; 36 CU	1120; 1233	161.3; 177.6	35.84; 39.46	5.161; 5.682	5.161; 5.682	0.323; 0.355	16	GDDR5; 256-bit	224	7000	150 W	PCIe 3.0 ×16
Radeon Instinct MI8 (Fiji)	Jun 20, 2017	GCN 3 TSMC 28 nm	gfx803	8.9×10^{9} 596 mm^{2}	4096:256:64; 64 CU	1000	256.0	64.00	8.192	8.192	0.512	4	HBM; 4096-bit	512	1000	175 W	PCIe 3.0 ×16
Radeon Instinct MI25 (Vega 10)	Jun 20, 2017	GCN 5 GloFo 14LP	gfx900	12.5×10^{9} 510 mm^{2}	4096:256:64; 64 CU	1400; 1500	358.4; 384.0	89.60; 96.00	22.94; 24.58	11.47; 12.29	0.717; 0.768	16	HBM2; 2048-bit	484	1890	300 W	PCIe 3.0 ×16
Radeon Instinct MI50 (Vega 20)	Nov 18, 2018	GCN 5 TSMC N7	gfx906	13.2×10^{9} 331 mm^{2}	3840:240:64; 60 CU	1450; 1725	348.0; 414.0	92.80; 110.4	22.27; 26.50	11.14; 13.25	5.568; 6.624	16; 32	HBM2; 4096-bit	1024	2000	300 W	PCIe 4.0 ×16
Radeon Instinct MI60 (Vega 20)	Nov 18, 2018	GCN 5 TSMC N7	gfx906	13.2×10^{9} 331 mm^{2}	4096:256:64; 64 CU	1500; 1800	384.0; 460.8	96.00; 115.2	24.58; 29.49	12.29; 14.75	6.144; 7.373	32	HBM2; 4096-bit	1024	2000	300 W	PCIe 4.0 ×16

AMD Instinct GPUs (has matrix units, no render output)
Model (Code name)	Launch	Architecture & fab	LLVM target	Transistors & die size	Core		Vector TFLOPS				Matrix speedup (Note: The matrix unit exists in addition to the main vector (SIMD) processing unit to accelerate matrix-multiplication operations common in machine learning applications. It is able to optimize the multiplication of common data types, resulting in a integer-multiple (typically 2×) increase in TFLOPS. Since CDNA3 it is also able to use structured sparsity regularization for a 2× increase in TFLOPS for all data types. In CDNA4 the speedup has been removed for FP32 and FP64, instead focusing the unit on speedups for low precision (INT8, MXFP4/6/8, OCP-FP8, FP16, BF16).)			Memory				TBP	Bus interface
Model (Code name)	Launch	Architecture & fab	LLVM target	Transistors & die size	Config	Clock (MHz)	INT8 (Note: CDNA3 and later supports packed FP8 (E5M2, E4M3) at the same level of performance.)	FP16 (Note: CDNA supports BF16 at half the performance as FP16. CDNA2 and later supports BF16 at the same performance level as FP16. CDNA3 and later supports TF32 at the same performance level as FP16.)	FP32	FP64	FP32	FP64	S.Sparse	Size (GB)	Bus type & width	Bandwidth (GB/s)	Clock (MT/s)	TBP	Bus interface
AMD Instinct MI100 (Arcturus)	Nov 16, 2020	CDNA 1 TSMC N7	gfx908	25.6×10^{9} 750 mm^{2}	7680:480:- 120 CU	1000; 1502	122.9; 184.6	122.9; 184.6	15.36; 23.07	7.680; 11.54	2×	2×	1×	32	HBM2; 4096-bit	1228.8	2400	300 W	PCIe 4.0 ×16
AMD Instinct MI210 (Aldebaran)	Mar 22, 2022	CDNA 2 TSMC N6	gfx90a	28 × 10^{9} ~770 mm^{2}	6656:416:- 104 CU (1 × GCD) (Note: GCD Refers to a Graphics Compute Die. Each GCD is a different piece of silicon. The same applies to XCDs and CCDs.)	1000; 1700	106.5; 181.0	106.5; 181.0	13.31; 22.63	13.31; 22.63	2×	2×	1×	64	HBM2E; 4096-bit	1638.4	3200	300 W	PCIe 4.0 ×16
AMD Instinct MI250 (Aldebaran)	Nov 8, 2021	CDNA 2 TSMC N6	gfx90a	58 × 10^{9} 1540 mm^{2}	13312:832:- 208 CU (2 × GCD)	1000; 1700	213.0; 362.1	213.0; 362.1	26.62; 45.26	26.62; 45.26	2×	2×	1×	2 × 64	HBM2E; 2 × 4096-bit (Note: CDNA 2.0 Based cards adopt a design using two dies on the same package.They are linked with 400GB/s Bidirectional Infinity Fabric link, The dies are addressed as individual GPUs by the host system.)	2 × 1638.4	3200	500 W 560 W (Peak)	PCIe 4.0 ×16
AMD Instinct MI250X (Aldebaran)	Nov 8, 2021	CDNA 2 TSMC N6	gfx90a	58 × 10^{9} 1540 mm^{2}	14080:880:- 220 CU (2 × GCD)	1000; 1700	225.3; 383.0	225.3; 383.0	28.16; 47.87	28.16; 47.87	2×	2×	1×	2 × 64	HBM2E; 2 × 4096-bit	2 × 1638.4	3200	500 W 560 W (Peak)	PCIe 4.0 ×16
AMD Instinct MI300A (Antares)	Dec 6, 2023	CDNA 3 TSMC N5 & N6	gfx942	146 × 10^{9} 1017 mm^{2}	14592:912:- 228 CU (6 × XCD) 24 Zen 4 x86 cores (3 × CCD)	2100	1961.2	980.6	122.6	61.3	1×	1×	2×	128	HBM3; 8192-bit	5300	5200	550 W 760 W (Liquid Cooling)	PCIe 5.0 ×16
AMD Instinct MI300X (Aqua Vanjaram)	Dec 6, 2023	CDNA 3 TSMC N5 & N6	gfx942	153 × 10^{9} 1017 mm^{2}	19456:1216:- 304 CU (8 × XCD)	2100	2614.9	1307.4	163.4	81.7	1×	1×	2×	192	HBM3; 8192-bit	5300	5200	750 W	PCIe 5.0 ×16
AMD Instinct MI325X (Aqua Vanjaram)	Dec 6, 2023	CDNA 3 TSMC N5 & N6	gfx942	153 × 10^{9} 1017 mm^{2}	19456:1216:- 304 CU (8 × XCD)	2100	2614.9	1307.4	163.4	81.7	1×	1×	2×	256	HBM3; 8192-bit	6000	6000	1000 W	PCIe 5.0 ×16
AMD Instinct MI350P	May 7, 2026	CDNA 4 TSMC N3 & N6	gfx950	unknown	8192:512:- 128 CU (4 × XCD)	2200	2300 (Note: Matrix only)	72	72	36	1×	1×	2×	144	HBM3e; 4096-bit	8000	8000	600 W	PCIe 5.0 ×16
AMD Instinct MI350X	Jun 12, 2025	CDNA 4 TSMC N3 & N6	gfx950	185 × 10^{9} 1017 mm^{2}	16384:1024:- 256 CU (8 × XCD)	2200	4600	144.2	144.2	72.1	1×	1×	2×	288	HBM3e; 8192-bit	8000	8000	1000 W	PCIe 5.0 ×16 (OAM)
AMD Instinct MI355X	Jun 12, 2025	CDNA 4 TSMC N3 & N6	gfx950	185 × 10^{9} 1017 mm^{2}	16384:1024:- 256 CU (8 × XCD)	2400	5000	157.3	157.3	78.6	1×	1×	2×	288	HBM3e; 8192-bit	8000	8000	1400 W	PCIe 5.0 ×16 (OAM)

== See also ==
- ROCm - AMD's open compute software stack
- AMD FirePro - AMD's predecessor to AMD Instinct
- AMD Radeon Pro - AMD's workstation graphics and GPGPU solution
- Nvidia Tesla - Nvidia's competing GPGPU solution
- List of AMD graphics processing units
