= BFP =

BFP may refer to:

== Organisations ==
- British First Party, a far-right British nationalist party
- Bangsamoro Federalist Party, a political party in Bangsamoro
- Bureau of Fire Protection, a Philippine government agency
- Federation of Pentecostal Churches (Germany) (Bund Freikirchlicher Pfingstgemeinden), a Pentecostal denomination in Germany

== Science and technology ==
- Back focal plane, in optics
- Body fat percentage, a value which shows what percent of the body is fat
- Boiler feedwater pump, mostly used in a power plant
- Blue fluorescent protein, a protein

=== Computing ===
- Binary floating point, floating point systems based on radix 2
- Block floating point, a calculation scheme using a common exponent

== Other uses ==
- Batters faced by pitcher or batters facing pitcher, a statistic in baseball
- Beaver County Airport (IATA code: BFP), an airport near Beaver, PA, US
- Bona fide purchaser, in property law
- Born from Pain, a metalcore band from the Netherlands
- Brain Force Plus, a supplement promoted by Alex Jones on Infowars
- The Burlington Free Press, a Vermont, US-based digital and print newspaper
