= Intel Xe =

Intel GPU architecture

Intel Iris Xe
- Release date: September 2, 2020; 6 years ago
- Manufactured by: Intel; TSMC
- Designed by: Intel
- Marketed by: Intel
- Fabrication process: TSMC N6

Cards
- Entry-level: Intel UHD Graphics
- Mid-range: Iris Xe Graphics
- High-end: Intel Arc

History
- Predecessor: Gen 11
- Successor: Intel Xe 2

Intel Xe (stylized as X^{e} and pronounced as two separate letters, abbreviation for "exascale for everyone"), earlier known unofficially as Gen12, is a GPU architecture developed by Intel.

Intel Xe includes a new instruction set architecture. The Xe GPU family consists of a series of microarchitectures, ranging from integrated/low power (Xe-LP), to enthusiast/high performance gaming (Xe-HPG), datacenter/high performance (Xe-HP) and high performance computing (Xe-HPC).

== History ==
Intel's first attempt at a dedicated graphics card was the Intel740, released in February 1998. The Intel740 was considered unsuccessful due to its performance which was lower than market expectations, causing Intel to cease development on future discrete graphics products. However, its technology lived on in the Intel Extreme Graphics lineup. Intel made another attempt with the Larrabee architecture before canceling it in 2009; this time, the technology developed was used in the Xeon Phi, which was discontinued in 2020.

In April 2018, it was reported that Intel was assembling a team to develop discrete graphics processing units, targeting both datacenters, as well as the PC gaming market, and therefore competitive with products from both Nvidia and AMD. Rumors supporting the claim included that the company had vacancies for over 100 graphics-related jobs, and had taken on former Radeon Technologies Group (AMD) leader Raja Koduri in late 2017 – the new product was reported to be codenamed "Arctic Sound". The project was reported to have initially been targeting video streaming chips for data centers, but had its scope expanded to include desktop GPUs.

In June 2018, Intel confirmed it planned to launch a discrete GPU in 2020.

The first functional discrete "Xe" GPU, codenamed "DG1", was reported as having begun testing in October 2019.

According to a report by Hexus in late 2019, a discrete GPU would launch in mid 2020; combined GPU/CPU (GPGPU) products were also expected, for data center and autonomous driving applications. The product was expected to initially be built on a 10 nm node (with 7 nm products in 2021) and use Intel's Foveros die stacking packaging technology (see 3D die stacking). During 2020, the first GPUs were released under the name Intel Iris Xe Max, being integrated in the 11th generation Intel Core processors (codenamed "Tiger Lake" and "Rocket Lake"), followed in 2021 by the Iris Xe DG1 card, exclusive to Intel OEM manufacturers. Finally and after some delays, the retail launch of these first discrete graphics cards from the company in over 20 years, known as the Intel Arc series, would occur during 2022.

== Architecture ==
Intel Xe expands upon the microarchitectural overhaul introduced in Gen 11 with a full refactor of the instruction set architecture. While Xe is a family of architectures, each variant has significant differences from each other as these are made with their targets in mind. The Xe GPU family consists of Xe-LP, Xe-HP, Xe-HPC, and Xe-HPG sub-architectures.

Unlike previous Intel graphics processing units which used the Execution Unit (EU) as a compute unit, Xe-HPG and Xe-HPC use the Xe-core. This is similar to an Xe-LP subslice. An Xe-core contains vector and matrix arithmetic logic units, which are referred to as vector and matrix engines. Other components include L1 cache and other hardware.

=== Xe-LP (Low Power) ===
Xe-LP is the low power variant of the Xe architecture with removed support for FP64. Xe-LP is present as integrated graphics for 11th-generation Intel Core and the Iris Xe MAX mobile dedicated GPU (codenamed DG1), as well as in the H3C XG310 Intel Server GPU (codenamed SG1). Compared to its predecessor, Xe-LP includes new features such as Sampler Feedback, Dual Queue Support, DirectX12 View Instancing Tier2, and AV1 8-bit and 10-bit fixed-function hardware decoding.

=== Xe-HP (High Performance) ===
Xe-HP is the datacenter/high performance variant of Xe, optimized for FP64 performance and multi-tile scalability.

=== Xe-HPC (High Performance Compute) ===
Xe-HPC is the high performance computing variant of the Xe architecture. An Xe-HPC Xe-core contains 8 vector and 8 matrix engines, alongside a large 512 KB L1 cache. It powers Ponte Vecchio.

=== Xe-HPG (High Performance Graphics) ===
Xe-HPG is the enthusiast or high performance graphics variant of the Xe architecture. The microarchitecture is based on Xe-LP with improvements from Xe-HP and Xe-HPC. The microarchitecture is focused on graphics performance and supports hardware-accelerated ray tracing, DisplayPort 2.0, XeSS or supersampling based on neural networks (similar to Nvidia DLSS), and DirectX 12 Ultimate. Intel confirmed ASTC support has been removed from hardware starting with Alchemist and future Intel Arc GPU microarchitectures will also not support it. An Xe-HPG Xe-core contains 16 vector engines and 16 matrix engines. An Xe-HPG render slice will consist of four Xe-cores, ray tracing hardware, and other components.

=== Xe-LPG (Low Power Graphics) ===
The Xe-LPG architecture is a low power variant of Xe-HPG designed for the tile-based iGPUs (tGPUs) of Intel's Meteor Lake and Arrow Lake processors. It is based on the same Arc Alchemist graphics (Gen 12.7) used by Intel's Arc A-series graphics cards but is optimized for operation with lower wattage and higher performance per watt.

== Intel Xe 2 ==
Intel Xe 2
- Release date: December 13, 2024
- Codename: Battlemage

History
- Predecessor: Intel Xe
- Successor: Intel Xe 3P

A successor to Xe was revealed during Intel Architecture Day 2021, under the name of Xe 2, codenamed Battlemage. In an exclusive interview with HardwareLuxx Tom Petersen confirmed that X^{e2} would be segmented into "Xe2-LPG" (Low Power Graphics) for integrated GPUs and "Xe2-HPG" (High Performance Graphics) for discrete GPUs. Xe 2 was first released with Xe2-LPG in Lunar Lake on September 24, 2024. On December 3 2024, Intel announced the Arc B-Series Graphics Cards for desktop, utilizing the Xe2-HPG architecture, which was later released on December 12 2024.

== Intel Xe 3 ==
Intel Xe 3 is the architecture for the iGPU in Panther Lake products, released in January 2026. It, among much of the Arc series, supports XeSS 3, which includes Multi-Frame Generation (MFG).

== Intel Xe 3P ==
Intel Xe 3P
- Codename: Celestial

History
- Predecessor: Intel Xe 2 Intel Xe 3
- Successor: Intel Xe 4

Intel Xe 3P, codenamed Celestial, is the upcoming successor to the Intel Xe 2 and Xe 3 microarchitecture.

The launch product is codenamed Crescent Island, and is expected to target applications ranging from AI inference to scientific computing, while using relatively-inexpensive LPDDR5X memory rather than the high-cost and currently supply-constrained HBM (which many competing Nvidia products use). Intel claims that the product will have a "second-half 2026 launch" date.

== Intel Xe 4 ==
Intel Xe 4
- Codename: Druid

History
- Predecessor: Intel Xe 3P

Intel Xe 4, codenamed Druid, is the upcoming successor to the Intel Xe 3 microarchitecture.

== Products using Xe ==
=== Integrated graphics ===
Newer Intel processors use the Xe-LP microarchitecture. These include 11th generation Intel Core processors (codenamed "Tiger Lake" and "Rocket Lake"), 12th generation Intel Core processors (codenamed "Alder Lake"), 13th generation Intel Core processors (codenamed "Raptor Lake"), and 14th generation Intel Core processors (codenamed "Raptor Lake Refresh"). The iGPUs in the Intel Core Ultra 100 series processors (codenamed "Meteor Lake") use the Xe-LPG microarchitecture. The Intel Core Ultra 200S and 200H/HX series processors (codenamed "Arrow Lake") also use the Xe-LPG microarchitecture in their iGPUs. Meanwhile, the Intel Core Ultra 200V series processors (codenamed "Lunar Lake") use the Xe2-LPG microarchitecture. The Intel Core Ultra 300 series (codenamed "Panther Lake") uses the Xe3 microarchitecture.

=== Discrete graphics ===
==== Intel Iris Xe Max (DG1) ====
Model	Launch	Process	Execution units	Shading units	Clock speeds		Memory				Processing power (GFLOPS)				Notes
Model	Launch	Process	Execution units	Shading units	Boost clock (MHz)	Memory (MT/s)	Size (GB)	Bandwidth (GB/s)	Bus type	Bus width (bit)	Half	Single	Double	INT8	Notes
Iris X^{e} MAX	November 1, 2020	Intel 10SF	96	768	1650	4266	4	68	LPDDR4X	128	5069	2534	—N/a	10138	
Iris X^{e}	January 26, 2021	Intel 10SF	80	640	900	4266	4	68	LPDDR4X	128	4224	2112			

In August 2020, Intel was reported to be shipping Xe DG1 GPUs for a possible late 2020 release, while also commenting on a DG2 GPU aimed at the enthusiast market (later found out to be the first generation of Intel Arc nicknamed "Alchemist"). The DG1 is also sold as the Iris Xe MAX and as Iris Xe Graphics (stylized as iRIS X^{e}) in laptops, while cards for developers are sold as the DG1 SDV.

The Xe MAX is an entry-level GPU that was first released on November 1, 2020, in China and is similar in most aspects to the integrated GPU found in Tiger Lake processors, the only differences being a higher clock speed, slightly higher performance and dedicated memory and a dedicated TDP requirement. It competes with Nvidia's laptop-level GeForce MX series GPUs. It is aimed at slim and highly portable productivity laptops and has 4 GB of dedicated LPDDR4X-4266 memory with a 128-bit-wide memory bus, has 96 EUs, 48 texture units, 24 ROPs, a peak clock speed of 1650 MHz and a performance of 2.46 FP32 teraFLOPs with a 25w TDP. By comparison, the integrated GPU in Tiger Lake processors has a performance of 2.1 FP32 teraFLOPs. The Xe MAX does not replace the system's integrated GPU; instead it was designed to work alongside it, so tasks are split between the integrated and discrete GPUs. It was initially available on only 3 laptops: The Asus VivoBook Flip 14 TP470, the Acer Swift 3X, and the Dell Inspiron 15 7000. Intel Xe MAX GPUs can only be found on systems with Tiger Lake processors.

Intel officially announced Intel Iris Xe Graphics desktop cards for OEMs and system integrators on January 26, 2021. It is aimed at mainstream desktop and business PCs as an improvement over other graphics options in AV1 video decoding, HDR (high dynamic range) video support and deep learning inference, and is not as powerful as its laptop counterpart, with only 80 enabled EUs. The first cards are made by Asus, have DisplayPort 1.4, HDMI 2.0, Dual Link DL-DVI-D outputs and are passively cooled.

==== Intel Arc Alchemist ====
Intel Arc is a high-performance discrete graphics line optimized for gaming. This will competes with the Radeon and GeForce lines of graphics processing units. The first generation (codenamed "Alchemist"), was developed under the "DG2" name and is based on the Xe-HPG architecture. The second generation (codenamed "Battlemage") was developed under the "DG3" name and is based on the Xe^{2} architecture. Future generations include Celestial ("DG4", based on Xe^{3}P), and Druid ("DG5").

===== Desktop =====
Overview of Intel Arc Alchemist GPUs
Branding and Model		Launch	MSRP (USD)	Code name	Process	Transistors (billion)	Die size (mm^{2})	Core config (Note: Shading cores (ALU): texture mapping units (TMU): render output units (ROP): ray tracing units (tensor cores (XMX): execution units: render slices))	L2 cache	Clock rate (MHz) (Note: Boost values (if available) are stated below the base value in italic.)	Fillrate		Memory					Processing power (TFLOPS)			TDP	Bus interface
Branding and Model		Launch	MSRP (USD)	Code name	Process	Transistors (billion)	Die size (mm^{2})	Core config	L2 cache	Clock rate (MHz)	Pixel (GP/s)	Texture (GT/s)	Type	Size (GB)	Bandwidth (GB/s)	Bus width	Clock (MT/s)	Half precision (base)	Single precision (base)	Double precision (base)	TDP	Bus interface
Arc 3	A310	Sep 28, 2022	$110	ACM-G11 (DG2-128)	TSMC; N6	7.2	157	6 Xe cores 768:32:16:6 (192:96:2)	4 MB	2000; 2000	32	64	GDDR6	4 GB	124	64-bit	15500	6.144	3.072	n/a	75 W	PCIe 4.0 x8
Arc 3	A380	Jun 14, 2022	$139	ACM-G11 (DG2-128)	TSMC; N6	7.2	157	8 Xe cores 1024:64:32:8 (256:128:2)	4 MB	2000; 2050	64; 65.6	128; 131.2	GDDR6	6 GB	186	96-bit	15500	8.192; 8.3968	4.096; 4.1984	n/a n/a	75 W	PCIe 4.0 x8
Arc 5	A580	Oct 10, 2023	$179	ACM-G10 (DG2-512)	TSMC; N6	21.7	406	24 Xe cores 3072:192:96:24 (768:384:6)	8 MB	1700; 1700	163.2	326.4	GDDR6	8 GB	512	256-bit	16000	20.890	10.445	n/a	175 W	PCIe 4.0 x16
Arc 7	A750	Oct 14, 2022	$289	ACM-G10 (DG2-512)	TSMC; N6	21.7	406	28 Xe cores 3584:224:112:28 (896:448:7)	16 MB	2050; 2400	229.6; 268.8	393.6; 460.8	GDDR6	8 GB	512	256-bit	16000	29.3888; 34.4064	14.6944; 17.2032	n/a n/a	225 W	PCIe 4.0 x16
Arc 7	A770 8GB	Oct 14, 2022	$329	ACM-G10 (DG2-512)	TSMC; N6	21.7	406	32 Xe cores 4096:256:128:32 (1024:512:8)	16 MB	2100; 2400	268.8; 307.2	537.6; 614.4	GDDR6	8 GB	512	256-bit	16000	34.4064; 39.3216	17.2032; 19.6608	n/a n/a	225 W	PCIe 4.0 x16
Arc 7	A770 16GB	Oct 14, 2022	$349	ACM-G10 (DG2-512)	TSMC; N6	21.7	406	32 Xe cores 4096:256:128:32 (1024:512:8)	16 MB	2100; 2400	268.8; 307.2	537.6; 614.4	GDDR6	16 GB	560	256-bit	17500	34.4064; 39.3216	17.2032; 19.6608	n/a n/a	225 W	PCIe 4.0 x16

===== Mobile =====
Overview of Intel Arc Alchemist GPUs for mobile devices
Branding and Model		Launch	Code name	Process	Transistors (billion)	Die size (mm^{2})	Core config (Note: Shading cores (ALU): texture mapping units (TMU): render output units (ROP): ray tracing units (tensor cores (XMX): execution units: render slices)) (Note: Texture fillrate is calculated as the number of texture mapping units (TMUs) multiplied by the base (or boost) core clock speed.)	L2 cache	Core clock (MHz) (Note: Boost values (if available) are stated below the base value in italic.)	Fillrate (Note: Pixel fillrate is calculated as the lowest of three numbers: number of ROPs multiplied by the base core clock speed, number of rasterizers multiplied by the number of fragments they can generate per rasterizer multiplied by the base core clock speed, and the number of streaming multiprocessors multiplied by the number of fragments per clock that they can output multiplied by the base clock rate.)		Memory					Processing power (TFLOPS)			TDP	Bus interface
Branding and Model		Launch	Code name	Process	Transistors (billion)	Die size (mm^{2})	Core config	L2 cache	Core clock (MHz)	Pixel (GP/s)	Texture (GT/s)	Type	Size	Bandwidth (GB/s)	Bus width	Clock (MT/s)	Half precision	Single precision	Double precision	TDP	Bus interface
Arc 3	A350M	Mar 30, 2022	ACM-G11 (DG2-128)	TSMC; N6	7.2	157	6 Xe cores 768:48:24:6 (96:96:2)	4 MB	1150; 2200	27.6; 52.8	55.2; 105.6	GDDR6	4 GB	112	64-bit	14000	3.5328; 6.7584	1.7664; 3.3792	0.4416; 0.8448	25–35 W	PCIe 4.0 ×8
Arc 3	A370M	Mar 30, 2022	ACM-G11 (DG2-128)	TSMC; N6	7.2	157	8 Xe cores 1024:64:32:8 (128:128:2)	4 MB	1550; 2050	49.6; 65.6	99.2; 131.2	GDDR6	4 GB	112	64-bit	14000	6.3488; 8.3968	3.1744; 4.1984	0.7936; 1.0496	35–50 W	PCIe 4.0 ×8
Arc 5	A530M	Q3 2023	ACM-G12 (DG2-256)	TSMC; N6			12 Xe cores 1536:96:48:12 (192:192:3)	8 MB	1300			GDDR6	4 GB; 8 GB	224	128-bit	14000				65–95 W	PCIe 4.0 ×8
Arc 5	A550M	Q2 2022	ACM-G10 (DG2-512)	TSMC; N6	21.7	406	16 Xe cores 2048:128:64:16 (256:256:4)	8 MB	900; 1700	57.6; 108.8	115.2; 217.6	GDDR6	8 GB	224	128-bit	14000	7.3728; 13.9264	3.6864; 6.9632	0.9216; 1.7408	60–80 W	PCIe 4.0 ×8
Arc 5	A570M	Q3 2023	ACM-G12 (DG2-256)	TSMC; N6			16 Xe cores 2048:128:64:16 (256:256:4)	8 MB	1300			GDDR6	8 GB	224	128-bit	14000				75–95 W	PCIe 4.0 ×8
Arc 7	A730M	Q2 2022	ACM-G10 (DG2-512)	TSMC; N6	21.7	406	24 Xe cores 3072:192:96:24 (384:384:6)	12 MB	1100; 2050	105.6; 196.8	211.2; 393.6	GDDR6	12 GB	336	192-bit	14000	13.5168; 25.1904	6.7584; 12.5952	1.6896; 3.1488	80–120 W	PCIe 4.0 ×16
Arc 7	A770M	Q2 2022	ACM-G10 (DG2-512)	TSMC; N6	21.7	406	32 Xe cores 4096:256:128:32 (512:512:8)	16 MB	1650; 2050	211.2; 262.4	422.4; 524.8	GDDR6	16 GB	512	256-bit	16000	27.0336; 33.5872	13.5168; 16.7936	3.3792; 4.1984	120–150 W	PCIe 4.0 ×16

===== Workstation =====
Overview of Intel Arc Alchemist GPUs for Workstations
Branding and Model		Launch	Code name	Process	Transistors (billion)	Die size (mm^{2})	Core config (Note: Shading cores (ALU): texture mapping units (TMU): render output units (ROP): ray tracing units (tensor cores (XMX): execution Units: render slices))	L2 cache	Core clock (MHz) (Note: Boost values (if available) are stated below the base value in italic.)	Fillrate (Note: Pixel fillrate is calculated as the lowest of three numbers: number of ROPs multiplied by the base core clock speed, number of rasterizers multiplied by the number of fragments they can generate per rasterizer multiplied by the base core clock speed, and the number of streaming multiprocessors multiplied by the number of fragments per clock that they can output multiplied by the base clock rate.) (Note: Texture fillrate is calculated as the number of texture mapping units (TMUs) multiplied by the base (or boost) core clock speed.)		Memory					Processing power (TFLOPS)			TDP	Bus interface
Branding and Model		Launch	Code name	Process	Transistors (billion)	Die size (mm^{2})	Core config	L2 cache	Core clock (MHz)	Pixel (GP/s)	Texture (GT/s)	Type	Size	Bandwidth (GB/s)	Bus width	Clock (MT/s)	Half precision	Single precision	Double precision	TDP	Bus interface
Arc Pro	A30M	Aug 8, 2022	ACM-G11 (DG2-128)	TSMC; N6	7.2	157	8 Xe cores 1024:64:32:8 (128:128:2)	4 MB	1550			GDDR6	4 GB	112	64-bit	14000		4.20		50 W	PCIe 4.0 x8
Arc Pro	A40	Aug 8, 2022	ACM-G11 (DG2-128)	TSMC; N6	7.2	157	8 Xe cores 1024:64:32:8 (128:128:2)	4 MB	1550			GDDR6	6 GB	192	96-bit	16000		5.02		50 W	PCIe 4.0 x8
Arc Pro	A50	Aug 8, 2022	ACM-G11 (DG2-128)	TSMC; N6	7.2	157	8 Xe cores 1024:64:32:8 (128:128:2)	4 MB	2050			GDDR6	6 GB	192	96-bit	16000		5.02		75 W	PCIe 4.0 x8
Arc Pro	A60M	June 6, 2023	ACM-G12 (DG2-256)	TSMC; N6			16 Xe cores 2048:128:64:16 (256:256:4)		1300			GDDR6	8 GB	256	128-bit	16000		9.42		95 W	PCIe 4.0 x16
Arc Pro	A60	June 6, 2023	ACM-G12 (DG2-256)	TSMC; N6			16 Xe cores 2048:128:64:16 (256:256:4)		2000			GDDR6	12 GB	384	192-bit	16000		10.04		130 W	PCIe 4.0 x16

=== Battlemage ===
Battlemage (X^{e}2) is the second-generation X^{e} architecture that debuted with its low power variant in Lunar Lake mobile processors that released in September 2024. On December 3, 2024, Intel announced two Arc B-Series desktop graphics cards based on the X^{e}2-HPG graphics architecture.

==== Desktop ====
Overview of Intel Arc Battlemage GPUs
Branding and Model		Launch	MSRP (USD)	Code name	Process	Transistors (billion)	Die size (mm^{2})	Core		Cache		Memory					Fillrate		Processing power (TFLOPS)			TDP	Bus interface
Branding and Model		Launch	MSRP (USD)	Code name	Process	Transistors (billion)	Die size (mm^{2})	Core Config	Clock (MHz)	L1	L2	Type	Size	Bandwidth (GB/s)	Bus width	Clock (MT/s)	Pixel (GP/s)	Texture (GT/s)	Half precision	Single precision	Double precision	TDP	Bus interface
Arc 5	B570	Jan 16, 2025	$219	BMG-G21	TSMC N5	19.6	272	18 X^{e} Cores (144) 2304:144:72:18:144 (128:128:5)	1700 2500	4.5 MB	10 MB	GDDR6	10 GB	380	160-bit	19000	122.4 200.0	244.8 360.0	23.04	11.52	1.44	150 W	PCIe 4.0 x8
Arc 5	B580	Dec 13, 2024	$249	BMG-G21	TSMC N5	19.6	272	20 X^{e} Cores (160) 2560:160:80:20:160 (160:160:5)	1700 2670	5 MB	12 MB	GDDR6	12 GB	456	192-bit	19000	136.0 213.6	272.0 427.2	27.34	13.67	1.709	190 W	PCIe 4.0 x8

1. Pixel fillrate is calculated as the number of render output units (ROPs) multiplied by the base (or boost) core clock speed.
2. Texture fillrate is calculated as the number of texture mapping units (TMUs) multiplied by the base (or boost) core clock speed.
3. X^{e}2-HPG Cores (X^{e} Vector Engines)

Unified Shaders : Texture Mapping Units : Render Output Units : Ray Tracing Cores : XMX Cores

1. Boost values (if available) are stated below the base value in italics.

==== Workstation ====
Overview of Intel Arc Battlemage GPUs for Workstations
Branding and Model		Launch	MSRP (USD)	Code name	Process	Transistors (billion)	Die size (mm^{2})	Core		L2 cache	Fillrate		Memory					Processing power (TFLOPS)				TDP	Bus interface
Branding and Model		Launch	MSRP (USD)	Code name	Process	Transistors (billion)	Die size (mm^{2})	Config	Clock (MHz)	L2 cache	Pixel (GP/s)	Texture (GT/s)	Type	Size	Bandwidth (GB/s)	Bus width	Clock (MT/s)	Half precision	Single precision	Double precision	XMX Half Precision	TDP	Bus interface
Arc Pro	B50	Sept 3, 2025	$349	BMG-G21	TSMC N5	19.86	272	16 Xe2-cores 2048:128:64:16:128 (128:128:4)	1700 2600	4 MB	87 133	218 332.8	GDDR6	16 GB	224	128-bit	14000	21.3	10.65	1.33	197	70 W	PCIe 5.0 x8
Arc Pro	B60	Q3 2025		BMG-G21	TSMC N5	19.86	272	20 Xe2-cores 2560:160:80:20:160 (160:160:5)	2400	16 MB	192	384	GDDR6	24 GB	456	192-bit	19000	24.5	12.8	1.54	170	120-200 W	PCIe 5.0 x8

1. Pixel fillrate is calculated as the lowest of three numbers: number of ROPs multiplied by the base core clock speed, number of rasterizers multiplied by the number of fragments they can generate per rasterizer multiplied by the base core clock speed, and the number of streaming multiprocessors multiplied by the number of fragments per clock that they can output multiplied by the base clock rate.
2. Texture fillrate is calculated as the number of texture mapping units (TMUs) multiplied by the base (or boost) core clock speed.
3. Shading cores (ALU): texture mapping units (TMU): render output units (ROP): ray tracing units (tensor cores (XMX): execution Units: render slices)
4. Boost values (if available) are stated below the base value in italic.

=== Future generations ===
Intel has revealed future generations of Intel Arc GPUs under development: Celestial (X^{e}3P), and Druid (X^{e}4).

=== Datacenter ===
==== Intel H3C XG310 ====
On November 11, 2020 Intel launched the H3C XG310 data center GPU consisting of four DG1 GPUs with 32 GB of LPDDR4X memory on a single-slot PCIe card. Each GPU is connected to 8 GB of memory over a 128-bit bus and the card uses a PCIe 3.0 x16 connection to the rest of the system. The GPUs use the Xe-LP (Gen 12.1) architecture.

==== Ponte Vecchio ====
Intel officially announced their Xe general HPC/AI GPU codenamed Ponte Vecchio on November 17, 2019. It was revealed to use the Xe-HPC variant of the architecture and Intel's 'Embedded Multi-Die Interconnect Bridge' (EMIB) and Foveros die stacking packaging on a Intel 4 node (previously referred to as 7 nm). Intel later confirmed at Architecture Day 2021 that Ponte Vecchio would use Compute Tiles manufactured on TSMC N5, Base Tiles and Rambo Cache Tiles manufactured using Intel 7 (previously referred to as 10 nm Enhanced SuperFin) and Xe Link Tiles manufactured on the TSMC N7 process. The new GPU is expected to be used in Argonne National Laboratory's new exascale supercomputer, Aurora, with compute nodes comprising two next generation Intel Xeon (codenamed "Sapphire Rapids") CPUs, and six Ponte Vecchio GPUs.

Model	Launch	Code name(s)	Process	Transistors (billion)	Die size (mm^{2})	Core config (Note: shading cores (ALU):texture mapping units (TMU):render output units (ROP):ray tracing units:tensor cores (XMX):execution Units)	Cache		Core clock (MHz) (Note: Boost values (if available) are stated below the base value in italic.)	Fillrate (Note: Pixel fillrate is calculated as the lowest of three numbers: number of ROPs multiplied by the base core clock speed, number of rasterizers multiplied by the number of fragments they can generate per rasterizer multiplied by the base core clock speed, and the number of streaming multiprocessors multiplied by the number of fragments per clock that they can output multiplied by the base clock rate.) (Note: Texture fillrate is calculated as the number of texture mapping units (TMUs) multiplied by the base (or boost) core clock speed.)		Memory					Processing power (TFLOPS)			TDP	Bus interface
Model	Launch	Code name(s)	Process	Transistors (billion)	Die size (mm^{2})	Core config	L1	L2	Core clock (MHz)	Pixel (GP/s)	Texture (GT/s)	Type	Size	Bandwidth (GB/s)	Bus width	Clock (MT/s)	Bfloat16	Single precision	Double precision	TDP	Bus interface
Data Center GPU Max 1100	Jan 10, 2023	Xe-HPC (Ponte Vecchio)	Multiple	100	1280	7168:448:0:56:448:448	28 MB	204 MB	1000; 1550	0	448.0; 694.4	HBM2E	48 GB	1228.8	3072-bit	3200	352	14.336; 22.221		300 W	PCIe 5.0 x16
Data Center GPU Max 1350	abandoned	Xe-HPC (Ponte Vecchio)	Multiple	100	1280	14336:896:0:112:896:896	56 MB	408 MB	750; 1550	0	672.0; 1388.8	HBM2E	96 GB	2457.6	6144-bit	3200	704	21.504; 44.442		450 W	PCIe 5.0 x16
Data Center GPU Max 1550	Jan 10, 2023	Xe-HPC (Ponte Vecchio)	Multiple	100	1280	16384:1024:0:128:1024:1024	64 MB	408 MB	900; 1600	0	921.6; 1638.4	HBM2E	128 GB	3276.8	8192-bit	3200	832	29.491; 54.423		600 W	PCIe 5.0 x16

==== Rialto Bridge ====
Intel officially announced the successor to Ponte Vecchio, GPU codenamed Rialto Bridge on May 31, 2022. On March 3, 2023 Intel announced the discontinuation of Rialto Bridge in favor of their tile-based flexible and scalable Falcon Shores XPU (CPU + GPU) set to arrive in 2025.

==== Arctic Sound ====
Under the codename Arctic Sound Intel developed data center GPUs for visual cloud and AI inference based on the Xe-HP architecture (Gen 12.5). The GPUs were supposed to be fabbed on Intel's 10nm node and have a die size of around 190 mm^{2} with 8 billion transistors. Up to four GPUs tiles could be combined into a single package together with HBM2e memory. In October 2021 Raja Koduri announced that Xe-HP won't be commercialized into a final product. Instead the Arctic Sound cards will be based on the Xe-HPG architecture (Gen 12.7), the same as the Alchemist consumer graphics cards. They were launched on August 24, 2022 as the Intel Data Center GPU Flex series. On March 3, 2023 Intel announced that it would discontinue the development of Lancaster Sound which was supposed to succeed Arctic Sound in 2023 with incremental improvements. Instead Intel will accelerate the development of Melville Sound which will be a significant architectural leap in terms of performance and features.

== Intel Graphics Technology ==
Intel Graphics Technology (GT) is a collective name for a series of integrated graphics processors (IGP) produced by Intel, which are manufactured on the same package or die as the central processing unit (CPU). It was first introduced in 2010 as Intel HD Graphics and renamed in 2017 to Intel UHD Graphics.

Before the advent of Intel HD Graphics, Intel integrated graphics were embedded in the northbridge of the motherboard as part of the Intel Hub architecture. They were known as Intel Extreme Graphics and Intel GMA. Within the Platform Controller Hub (PCH) development, the northbridge was eliminated, and graphics processing was moved onto the same die as the central processing unit (CPU). The previous integrated graphics solution from Intel, Intel GMA, had a reputation for insufficient performance and functionality, and therefore was not considered a good choice for more demanding graphics applications, such as 3D gaming. The performance increase provided by Intel HD Graphics made the products competitive with integrated graphics adapters produced by its competitors, Nvidia and ATI/AMD. Intel HD Graphics, demonstrating minimal power consumption, which is important for laptops, was sufficiently powerful that PC manufacturers often discontinued offering discrete graphics options in both lower and higher-end laptop lines where reduced size and low power consumption are important. Nowadays, if a mini-PC for a home office or a portable laptop for work and light entertainment is needed, Iris Xe Graphics may be the best choice.

Intel Iris Graphics and Intel Iris Pro Graphics are series of IGP introduced in 2013 with some Haswell processor models as high-performance versions of HD Graphics. Iris Pro Graphics was the first in the series to include embedded DRAM. Since 2016, Intel has called this technology Intel Iris Plus Graphics with the launch of Kaby Lake. In the fourth quarter of 2013, Intel integrated graphics accounted for 65% of all PC graphics processor shipments. However, this percentage does not reflect actual adoption, as some of those shipped devices ultimately ended up in systems with discrete graphics cards.

Intel HD and Iris Graphics are divided into generations, and within each generation into "performance tiers" designated by the "GTx" label. Each generation corresponds to an implementation of the Gen graphics microarchitecture with the corresponding GEN instruction set architecture starting from Gen4.
