= Amiga 600 =

Home computer introduced in 1992

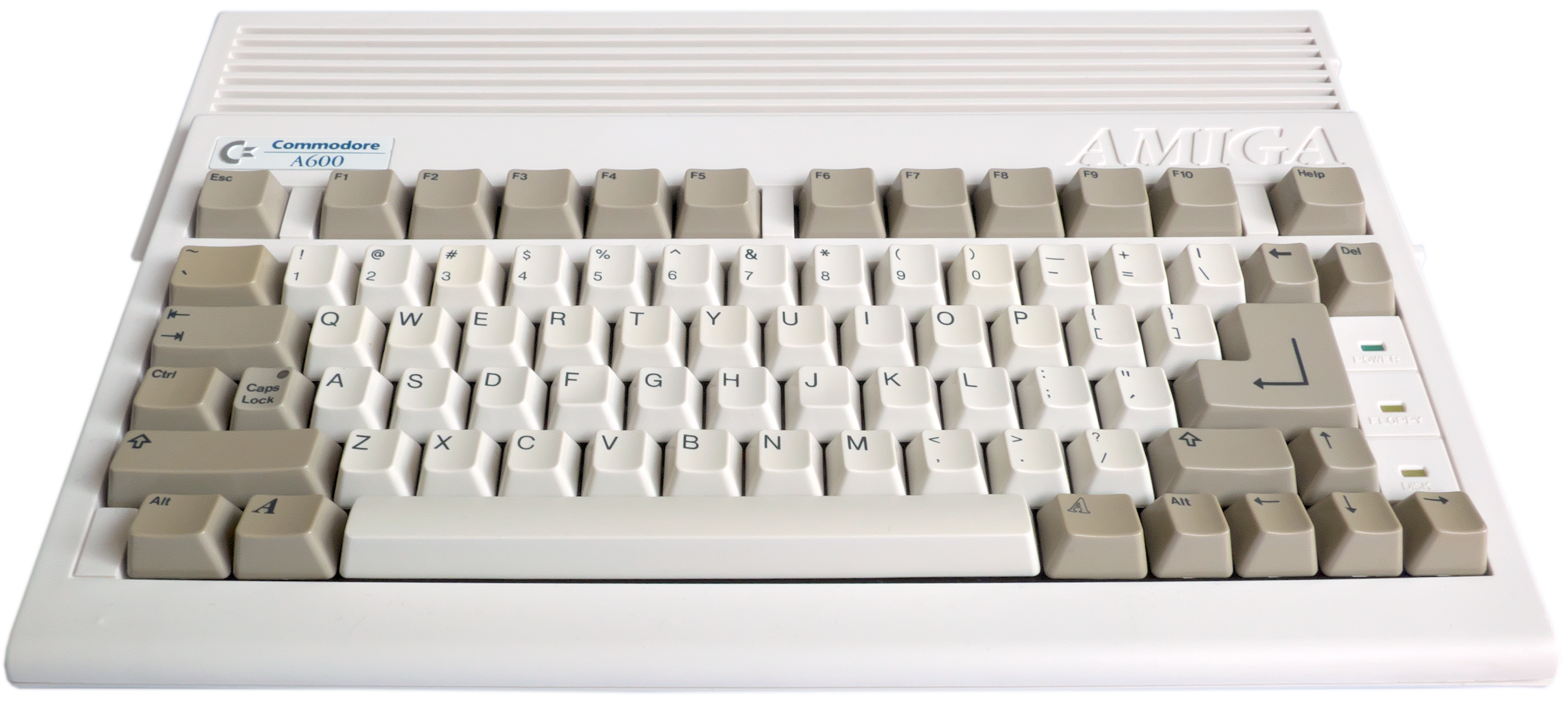
- An Amiga 600 computer
- Manufacturer: Commodore
- Type: Home computer
- Released: March 1992; 34 years ago
- Introductory price: £399 (equivalent to £880 in 2025); US$499 (equivalent to $1,140 in 2025)
- Discontinued: 1993
- Units sold: 193,000 units in Germany
- Operating system: AmigaOS 2.05 (up to 3.2 with ROM replacement and 3.9 with CPU upgrade)
- CPU: Motorola 68000 @ 7.16 MHz 7.09 MHz (PAL)
- Memory: 1 MB (80 ns access time) (6 MB maximum, more with unofficial expansions)
- Predecessor: Amiga 500, Amiga 500 Plus
- Related: Amiga 1200

The Amiga 600, also known as the A600, and full title Commodore Amiga 600, is a home computer introduced in March 1992. It is the final Amiga model based on the Motorola 68000 and the 1990 Amiga Enhanced Chip Set. A redesign of the Amiga 500 Plus, it adds the option of an internal hard disk drive and a PCMCIA port. Lacking a numeric keypad, the A600 is only slightly larger than an IBM PC keyboard, weighing approximately 6 pounds (2.72kg). It shipped with AmigaOS 2.0, which was considered more user-friendly than earlier versions of the operating system.

Like the A500, the A600 was aimed at the lower end of the market. Commodore intended it to revitalize sales of the A500-related line before the introduction of the 32-bit Amiga 1200. According to Dave Haynie, the A600 "was supposed to be US$50–60 cheaper than the A500, but it came in at about that much more expensive." The A600 was originally to have been numbered the A300, positioning it as a lower-budget version of the Amiga 500 Plus.

An A600HD model was sold with an internal 2.5" ATA hard disk drive of either 20 or 40 MB.

Due to the inclusion of Kickstart 2.05, many software titles made for A1000 or A500 do not work properly or at all on A600 or later. A program, Relokick, was released (and included with the March 1993 issue of CU Amiga) which loaded a Kickstart 1.3 ROM image into memory and booted the machine into Kickstart 1.3, allowing most incompatible software to run. Because Relokick itself occupies 512 KB of memory, some titles would not work unless the A600 was fitted with a 1 MB trapdoor memory expansion.

== Development and release ==
After the release of the Amiga 3000T, Commodore's next project was a next-generation Amiga chipset, which became the Advanced Graphics Architecture (AGA). Concurrently, engineers Dave Haynie, Jeff Porter, and Eric Lavitsky began work on Amiga 3000+, which would have been the first computer to use the AGA chipset, and Joe Augenbraun was behind the Amiga 1000+, which also would have used the chipset. Meanwhile, George Robbins designed another low-end project called the Amiga 300. The computer, codenamed June Bug, had a floppy drive built in and was roughly the same size and weight as a Commodore 64. Development took a turn on all three projects when Ali dismissed the engineering management team and appointed former IBM executive Bill Sydnes as the company's engineering manager. Sydnes canceled the A1000+ and A3000+ models and delayed the AGA chipset, but simply changed the A300's design goals.

The model was launched in mid-March 1992 as the Amiga 600, superseding the A500. Units were manufactured in Commodore's production plants in Irvine, Scotland; Braunschweig, Germany; Kwai Chung, Hong Kong; and the Philippines. In the United States, it and its hard disk drive variant, the Amiga 600HD, sold for $499.99 and $749.99, respectively, the former of which was about $50 more than an A500 while the two systems were on sale, although the A600 was supposed to be sold for about that much less. Sydnes canceled the still-popular A500 that year to ensure demand for the new system, and development on the Amiga series stalled for the first six months as he and Ali focused on targeting the PC marketplace while selling the new model. The Amiga 600 was discontinued in late 1993.

The machine is reported to have sold 193,000 units in Germany.

=== Bundled software ===
In addition to the stock A600, mouse, power supply, and Workbench disk package, the A600 was available with the following software and hardware bundles:

- 'Lemmings' bundle (1992): Lemmings and the Electronic Arts graphics package Deluxe Paint III
- 'Robocop 3D' bundle (1992): Robocop 3D, Myth, Shadow of the Beast III, Graphic Workshop and Microtext
- 'Wild, Weird and Wicked' bundle (late 1992, £349 launch price): Formula One Grand Prix, Pushover, Putty and Deluxe Paint III
- A600HD 'Epic/Language' bundle (late 1992, £499 launch price): including an internal 20 MB hard disk drive, Deluxe Paint III, a word processor, Trivial Pursuit, Myth, Rome and Epic

== Technical information ==
The A600 shipped with a Motorola 68000 CPU, running at 7.09 MHz (PAL) or 7.16 MHz (NTSC) and 1 MB "chip" RAM with 80 ns access time.

=== Graphics and sound ===
The A600 is the last Amiga model to use Commodore's Enhanced Chip Set (ECS), which can address 2 MB of Amiga Chip RAM and adds higher resolution display modes. The so-called Super Agnus display chip can drive screen modes varying from 320×200 pixels to 1280×512 pixels, with different frequency sync. As with the original Amiga chipset, up to 32 colors can be displayed from a 12-bit (4096 color) palette at lower display resolutions. An extra-half-bright mode offers 64 simultaneous colors by allowing each of the 32 colors in the palette to be dimmed to half brightness. Additionally, a 4096-color "HAM" mode can be used at lower resolutions. At higher resolutions, such as 800×600i, only 4 simultaneous colors can be displayed.

Sound was unchanged from the original Amiga design, namely, 4 DMA-driven 8-bit channels, with two channels for the left speaker and two for the right.

The A600 was the first Amiga model since the original Amiga 1000 with built-in color composite video (RCA), which allowed the A600 to be used with a standard CRT television without the need for a Commodore A520 RF Modulator adaptor.

=== Peripherals and expansion ===
Right and rear ports and slots

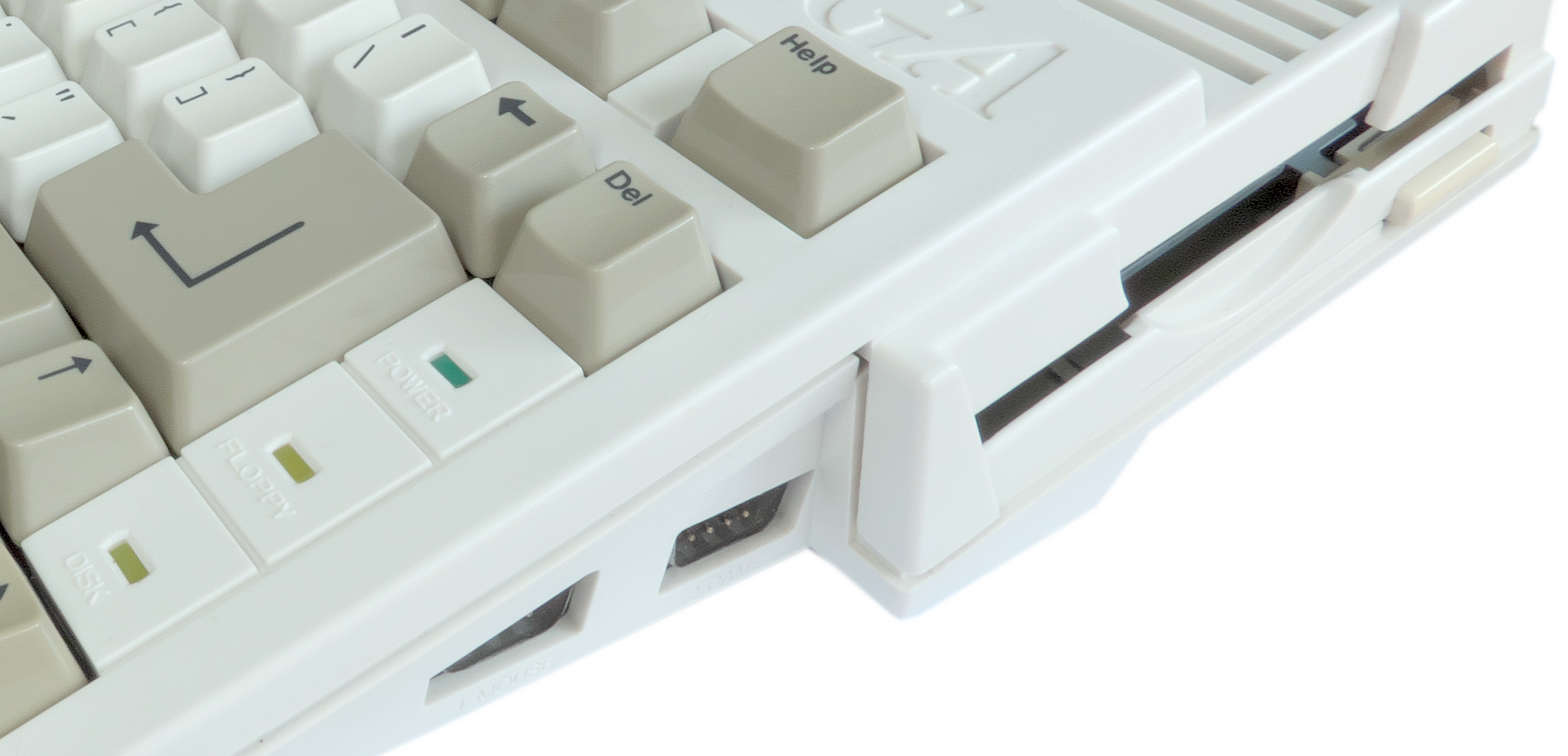
Right side of the Amiga 600, with its three LED lights, two Atari joystick ports, and one floppy drive.

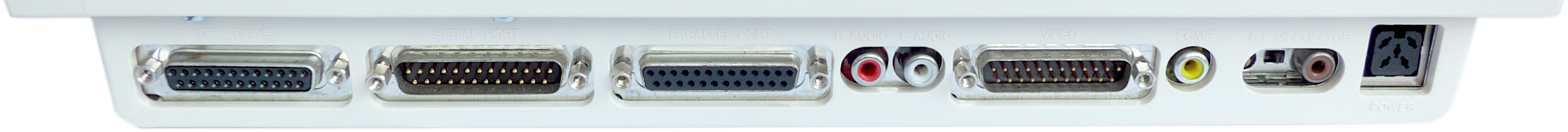
Rear panel. From left to right: an external floppy disk drive connector, a serial port, a parallel port, a pair of stereo audio ports, a port for video output, one for color composite video output, an RF modulator port, and a power socket.

The A600 features Amiga-specific connectors including two DE9M ports for joysticks, mice, and light pens, a standard 25-pin RS-232 serial port and a 25-pin Centronics parallel port. As a result, the A600 is compatible with many peripherals available for earlier Amiga models, such as MIDI, sound samplers and video-capture devices.

Expansion capabilities new to the Amiga line were the PCMCIA Type II slot and the internal 44-pin ATA interface both most commonly seen on laptop computers. Both interfaces are controlled by the 'Gayle' custom chip. The A600 has internal housing for one 2.5" internal hard disk drive connecting to the ATA controller.

The A600 is the first of only two Amiga models to feature a PCMCIA Type II interface. This connector allows use of a number of compatible peripherals available for the laptop-computer market, although only 16-bit PCMCIA cards are hardware-compatible; newer 32-bit PC Card (CardBus) peripherals are incompatible. Mechanically, only Type I and Type II cards fit in the slot; thicker Type III cards will not fit (although they may connect if the A600 is removed from its original case). The port is also not fully compliant with the PCMCIA Type II standard as the A600 was developed before the standard was finalized. The PCMCIA implementation on the A600 is almost identical to the one featured on a later Amiga, the 1200. A number of Amiga peripherals were released by third-party developers for this connector including SRAM cards, CD-ROM controllers, SCSI controllers, network cards, sound samplers, and video-capture devices. Although PCMCIA was similar in spirit to Commodore's expansion architecture for its earlier systems, the intended capability for convenient external expansion through this connector was largely unrealized at the time of release because of the prohibitive expense of PCMCIA peripherals for a lower-budget personal computer. Later, a number of compatible laptop-computer peripherals have been made to operate with the A600, including network cards (both wired and wireless), serial modems and CompactFlash adapters.

=== Operating system ===
The A600 shipped with AmigaOS 2.0, consisting of Workbench 2.0 and a Kickstart ROM revision 37.299, 37.300 or 37.350 (Commodore's internal revision numbers). Confusingly, all three ROM revisions were officially designated as version "2.05". Some early A600s shipped with Kickstart 37.299, which had neither support for the internal ATA controller, nor for the PCMCIA interface. Although it is possible to load the necessary drivers from floppy disk, it is not possible to boot directly from ATA or PCMCIA devices. Models fitted with Kickstart 37.300 or 37.350 can utilize those devices at boot time. Version 37.350 improved compatibility with ATA hard disks by increasing the wait time for disks to spin up during boot.

=== Specifications ===
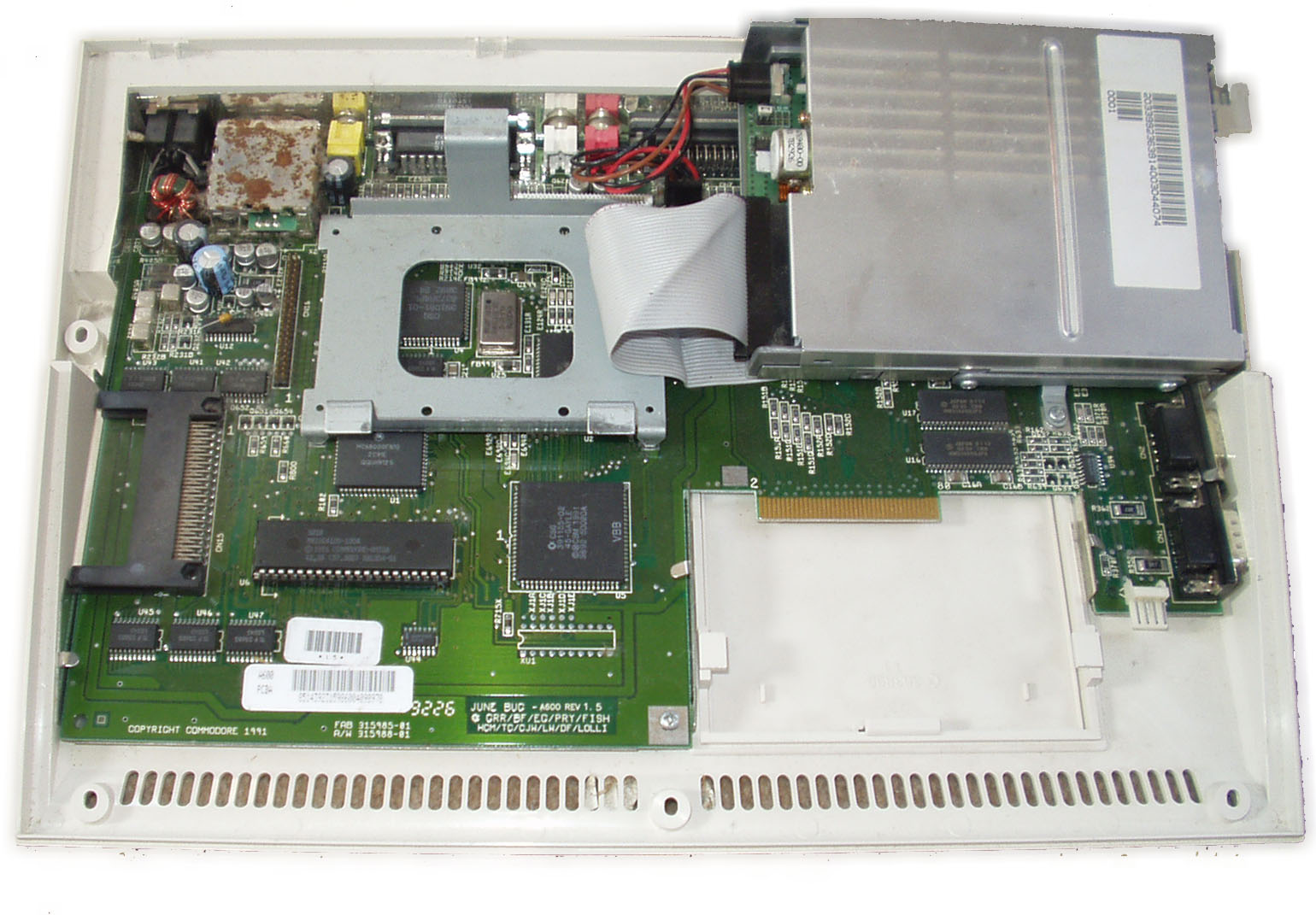
A600 with part of the case removed, showing the motherboard and floppy disk drive

Attribute	Specification
Processor	Motorola 68000 at 7.16 MHz (NTSC) or 7.09 MHz (PAL)
RAM	1 MB Amiga Chip RAM with 80 ns access time; upgradeable by further 1 MB in "trapdoor" expansion slot Up to 4 MB in PCMCIA slot Up to 64 MB with unofficial expansions, 64/128MB with Vampire/v2 600 and 512Mb with the A600 Apollo Manticore.
ROM	512 KB Kickstart ROM or 1 MB with unofficial expansions
Chipset	Enhanced Chip Set (ECS)
Video	12-bit color palette (4096 colors) Graphic modes from: 320×200 to 320×512i with 32, 64 (EHB mode) or 4096 (HAM mode) on-screen colors; 640×200 to 640×512i with 16 on-screen colors; 1280×200 to 1280×512i, 640×480p60 (VGA) with 4 on-screen colors
Audio	4 × 8-bit PCM channels (2 stereo channels) 28–56 kHz maximum DMA sampling rate (dependent on video mode in use); 70 dB S/N ratio
Removable storage	3.5" DD floppy disk drive (880 KB capacity)
Internal Storage	20 or 40 MB 2.5" hard disk drive (A600HD model only)
Audio/video out	Analog RGB video out (DB-23M) Colour Composite video out (RCA); RF audio/video out (RCA); Audio out (2 × RCA)
Input/output ports	2 × Mouse/Gamepad ports (DE9) RS-232 serial port (DB-25M); Centronics style parallel port (DB-25F); Floppy disk drive port (DB-23F); 44-pin ATA controller (internal); 16-bit Type II PCMCIA slot
Expansion slots	80-pin expansion slot for 1 MB RAM upgrade (may include a RTC)
Operating system	AmigaOS 2.0 (Workbench 2.04 and Kickstart 2.05 at launch, Workbench 2.05 and Kickstart 2.05 later) AmigaOS 3.1 and 3.2 (the latter requiring 2 MB RAM or more) with Kickstart 3.1 or 3.2 replacement respectively and 3.5/3.9 with 68020 CPU upgrade
Physical dimensions	350 × 240 × 75 mm (W × D × H)
Other	Integrated keyboard with 78 keys (without numeric keypad)

== Upgrades ==
=== CPU ===
Despite that the 68000 is soldered to the motherboard, unofficial CPU upgrades include the Motorola 68000 (at higher clock speeds than the default 7.16 MHz or 7.09 MHz), 68010, 68020 (at up to 25 MHz), 68030 (at up to 50 MHz) and FPGA-based processors which are programmed to utilize the Motorola 680x0 instruction set. The processor is upgraded not by replacing the 68000, but rather by fitting a connector over the CPU and commandeering the system bus.

=== Memory ===
RAM can be upgraded to a maximum of 2 MB Chip RAM using the trap-door expansion slot. An additional 4 MB of Fast RAM can be added in the PC Card slot using a suitable SRAM card to reach a capacity of 6 MB. However, additional Fast RAM can be added with unofficial memory or CPU upgrades. For example, the A608 board adds up to a maximum of 8 MB additional RAM by connecting over the original 68000. Likewise, CPU upgrades can accommodate up to 512 MB.

=== Operating system ===
It is possible to upgrade the A600 to Workbench 2.1. This features a localization of the operating system in several languages and has a "CrossDOS" driver providing read/write support for FAT (MS-DOS)-formatted media such as floppy disks or hard drives. Workbench 2.1 was a software only update which runs on all Kickstart ROMs of the 2.0x family.

Following the release of AmigaOS 3.1 in 1994 it is possible to upgrade the A600 by installing a compatible revision 40.63 Kickstart ROM.

The A600 also supports AmigaOS 3.2.x, which is maintained by Hyperion Entertainment. This requires the installation of a compatible revision 47.96 Kickstart ROM and additional memory over and above the default 1 MB.

=== Other ===
The FPGA-driven Apollo Vampire V2 adds 128 MB Fast RAM, HDMI output, SD card for HDD storage and a 64-bit core with full 32-bit compatibility.

Additionally, the Apollo Manticore (Apollo Vampire V4) adds 512 MB DD3 RAM (500Mb Fast RAM and 12Mb Chip RAM), HDMI output, SD card for HDD storage (this device cannot be booted from), 64-bit "68080" core with full 32-bit compatibility, 2 x USB ports, 8/16-bit, 56 kHz, 24-bit audio with 16 DMA voices, 44-pin FastIDE for Compact Flash or 2.5" IDE hard disk support, 10/100 RJ45 Ethernet port, RTC support and RTG video capable of 3D graphics up to 1920x1080 resolution at 60 Hz. The Apollo Manticore also includes a "Super AGA" FPGA-driven chipset. Apart from providing RTG, it allows the Amiga 600 to run AGA software titles which would normally only run on the Amiga 1200, Amiga 4000 or Amiga 4000T.

== Reception ==
Contemporaneous reviews of the Amiga 600 were mixed. The magazine Amazing Computing called it "an Amiga Warrior that offers an enormous opportunity to Amiga computing and the consumer market", saying that it struck a balance between two markets of cartridge-based game consoles and home and business computers. It wrote that the changes to the model were incremental, rather than revolutionary, as only its design was substantially revised and not the Amiga computer itself—an important consideration for potential buyers who already owned an Amiga 500. The decision to solder all circuitry other than the ROM chip on the motherboard, it said, allowed Commodore to manufacture a model that was more compact and more reliable, albeit with new hurdles on internal upgrading. The PCMCIA slot was viewed as an advantageous measure eliminating almost all possibilities of software piracy, and while the magazine noted that a majority of expansion hardware for the A500 would not work with this model, it believed the same community that reversed the expansion hardware's A1000 ports for use by A500 systems would supply the A600 with many peripherals.

Amiga Computing reviewed the original and hard drive models and was more favorable to the latter. It found that the A600 model performed about as fast as an Amiga 500 Plus computer, but it praised the A600HD variant's use of a hard drive as offering the user more storage space and functionality than any other low-end Amiga model. Regarding both models, it praised the addition of an RF port, but criticized the power supply brick as the only impediment to the computers' advertised portability. It considered compatibility issues arising from software requiring the numeric keypad to be insignificant. However, while writing that the move to use surface-mounted technology made the computer more reliable and less prone to error, it conceded that it also meant that attempts to upgrade it internally had more obstacles. It also criticized the lack of the DMA expansion slot. Nevertheless, the magazine predicted that the A600HD model would capture the hobbyist market and stimulate the production of hard drive-installable games.

Conversely, editor-in-chief of Amiga World Doug Barney took a more negative stance on the A600. He similarly criticized the need for the power brick, and also questioned Commodore's design choices, in particular, removing the expansion slot, retaining the Motorola 68000 processor, and replacing an A501 connector with an A601 one, although not minding the loss of the numeric keypad. He further took issue with the barriers to upgrading the machine internally. He said the model was best suited for users who needed to travel with it and are not interested in expanding their systems but saw no incentive for users who wanted upgradeability.

Internal reception among Commodore employees was also negative. The managing director of Commodore UK, David Pleasance, described the A600 as a "complete and utter screw-up". Disgruntled Commodore engineers nicknamed the model the "Amiga Junior", a reference to Sydnes' previous project of which he was in charge while at IBM, the IBM PCjr, which was a critical and commercial failure. Nonetheless, in Germany, it became the second-best-selling Amiga model, with 193,000 units sold. Dave Haynie, who worked as a senior engineer for Commodore, described the new features the A600 provided as bloat and noted its compatibility issues with A500 peripherals and lack of numeric keypad. Another Commodore engineer Bil Herd, pointed to a disconnect between the company's design team, its marketing team, and the demands of the marketplace. Ars Technica considers it to be the worst of Commodore's Amiga models, citing its higher price and fewer features compared to the Amiga 500, while also noting that markets were overstocked with A600 units at the same time that the more popular A500 and A1200 models were under-manufactured.

== See also ==
- List of Amiga models and variants
