= Amiga custom chips =

Custom chips used in Amiga computers

In addition to the Amiga chipsets, various specially designed chips have been used in Commodore Amiga computers that do not belong to the 'Amiga chipset' in a tight sense.

== System logic ==
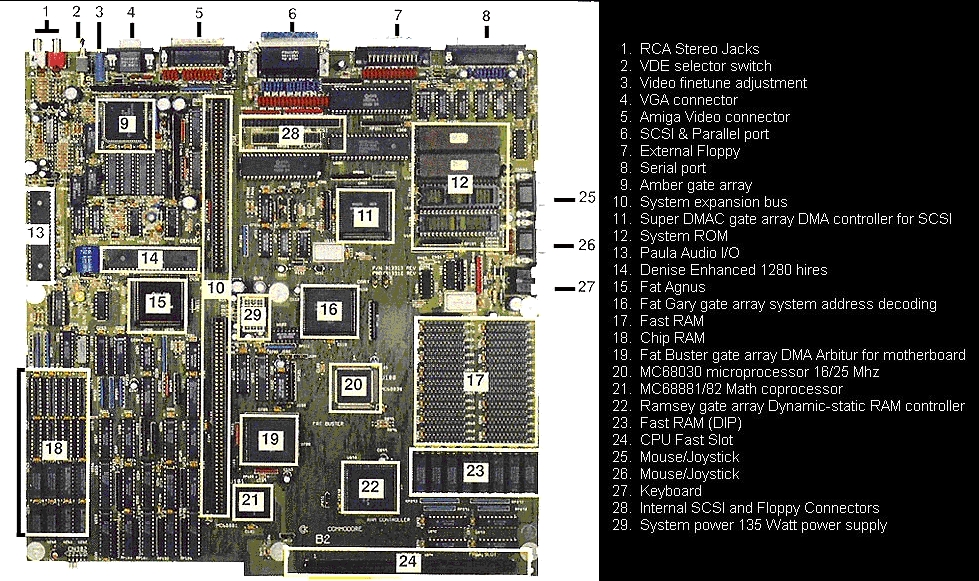
Amiga 3000 motherboard showing various custom chips

=== Gary ===
CSG 5719 Gary, short for Gate Array, has been used in the Amiga 500, 2000(B) and CDTV. Gary provides glue logic for bus control and houses supporting functions for the floppy disk drive. It integrates many functions built discretely in the earlier Amiga 1000 in order to reduce costs.

=== Fat Gary ===
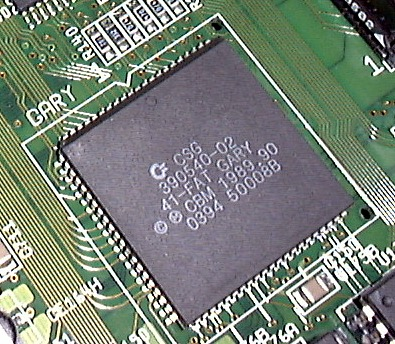
Fat Gary in Amiga 4000

Fat Gary was Gary's upgrade for the 32-bit A3000/T and A4000/T.

=== Gayle ===
Gayle replaced Gary in the A600 and A1200. It also incorporates the control logic for the PCMCIA and internal ATA interface on these systems.

=== Akiko ===
Akiko is the CD32's all-purpose 'glue' chip and forms part of the AGA chipset used in that system. Akiko is responsible for implementing system glue logic that in previous Amiga models were found in the discrete chips Budgie, Gayle and the two CIAs. In detail, it includes control logic for the CD32's CD-ROM controller, system timers, the two game ports, the serial ('AUX') port, and the chip memory soldered onto the motherboard. It controls a one kilobyte EEPROM for saving data such as highscores etc.

Additionally, the Akiko chip is able to assist simple 'chunky-to-planar' graphics conversion in hardware. The Amiga's native display is a planar display which is simple and efficient to manipulate for routines like scrolling or 2D composition. However, chunky displays are faster and more efficient for 3D graphics manipulation. Akiko assists this conversion in hardware, instead of shifting the bits solely by CPU code which would cause more overhead. The conversion works by writing 32 8-bit chunky pixels to Akiko's registers and reading back eight 32-bit words of converted planar data to be copied to the display buffer.

=== Bridgette ===
Bridgette is an integrated bus buffer in the A4000 series. It connects the chip, CPU and I/O buses. It replaces six 74F646s and four 74F245s chips used in the original A3000 design.

== Expansion ==
=== Buster ===
Buster is the expansion BUS conTrollER and was used in the Amiga 2000(B), integrating discrete logic from the original A2000(A). Buster controls bus arbitration and DMA for the Zorro II expansion subsystem.

=== Super Buster (Fat Buster) ===
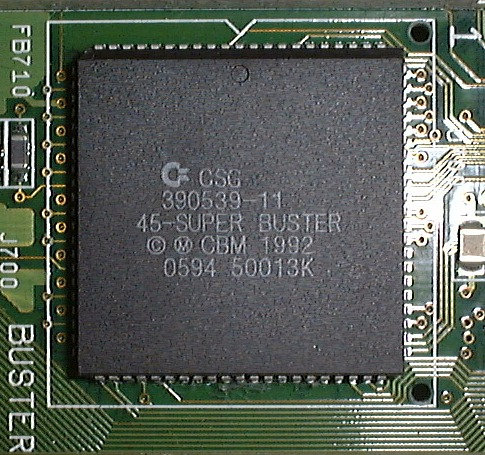
Super Buster in A4000

The Amiga 3000 and 4000 lines use Super Buster for bus control and arbitration of both Zorro II and Zorro III subsystems. Super Buster's development was never really finished, so there are various levels of compatibility. All revision Super Buster are pin-compatible and can be upgraded.

- Level I - up to rev 7 (A3000), only provides support for basic Zorro III without DMA.
- Level II
  - rev 9 (A4000) is slightly faster than Level I. It provides DMA support, but has a bug that might lead to a bus lockup.
  - rev 11 (Late A4000, A4000CR, A4000T and aftermarket) provides DMA support for a single bus master. A 16 MHz A3000 requires a 25 MHz upgrade for Buster 11 to work.

All revisions fully support Zorro II PIO and DMA.

=== Budgie ===
Used in the A1200, Budgie connects the trapdoor expansion port for Zorro II-like expansions and controls additional Fast RAM.

== Memory and direct memory access ==
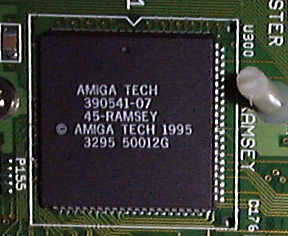
Ramsey in A4000T

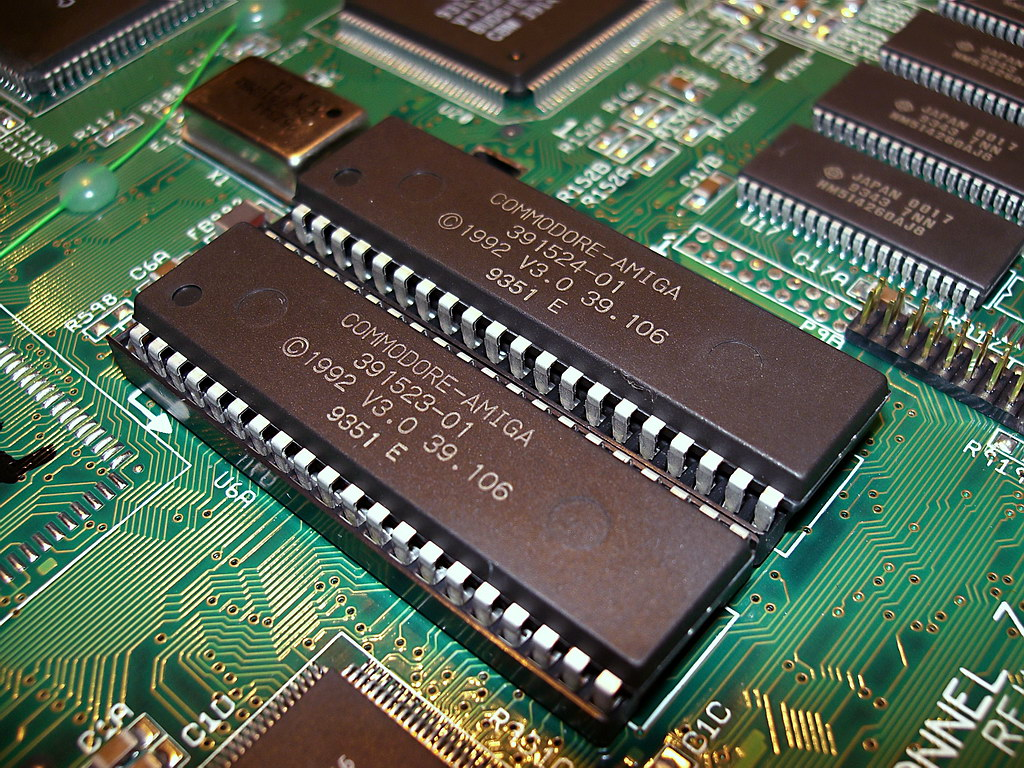
A1200 Kickstart 3.0 ROMs

=== 8727 DMA ===
The MOS Technology 8727 DMA was used on the A2090(A) ST-506/SCSI Controller and provides DMA management for the Konan DJC-002 (ST-506) and the WD33C93 SCSI controllers with byte-to-word funnelling and a 64-byte FIFO buffer.

=== DMAC ===
Used in A2091/A590 SCSI adapters, the CDTV, and the A570 CDROM expansion, the 16-bit DMAC provides DMA and bus interface for the WD33C93A SCSI controller or the A570's XC2064 FPGA chip and includes 24-bit address generation.

=== Ramsey & Super DMAC ===
In the A3000 and A4000 series, Ramsey controls the on-board 32-bit Fast RAM, four banks of either 1 or 4 MiB, and provides address generation for Super DMAC. The SDMAC in the A3000/T provides DMA and bus interface for the integrated WD33C93A SCSI controller.

Officially, SDMAC rev 02 requires a Ramsey 04, and SDMAC 04 a Ramsey 07 counterpart. but SDMAC 04 + Ramsey 04 combinations have been reported to work as well. A combination of SDMAC 02 + Ramsey 07 generally works, but major hard disk errors have been reported.

=== Kickstart ===
The Kickstart ROM is not a custom chip but a mask-programmed ROM chip for most versions. It contains the largest part of the operating system. Kickstart 1.x ROMs have a capacity of 256 KiB, Kickstart 2.x and 3.x contain 512 KiB. 32-bit Amigas use a pair of 16-bit chips to provide full-width access. Later, non mass-produced upgrade versions were often realized with PROMs or EPROMs.

== Input/output ==
=== CIA ===
All Amiga computers use two 8520 CIAs (Complex Interface Adapter) for peripheral interfacing and the system timers, except for the CD32, where these functions are performed by the Akiko chip. The CIA chips were also used in some other Commodore devices.

- 'Even' CIA functions: floppy control, serial control, some parallel port status
- 'Odd' CIA functions: parallel port, keyboard, some floppy support, joystick/mouse button number one.

== Video ==
=== 390562 ===
The 'Hedley Controller' 390562-01 was used in the A2024 high resolution monitor and controls the frame buffer (usually eight 64K×4 DRAMs) in either flicker fixer mode or its own special 1024×800/1024×1024 resolution modes.

=== Amber ===
Amber (390538-03) was used in the A3000(T) and on the A2320 flicker fixer expansion for the A2000. Amber buffers alternate video fields in three 256K×4 field memory chips (OKI MSM514221) to convert interlaced output to progressive format ('weaving') at 31 kHz, twice the normal scan frequency. Amber can accurately sample Lores and Hires modes but drops every other horizontal pixel in SuperHires (35 ns pixels) mode (for simplicity, it always runs in Hires mode). Non 15 kHz modes are automatically bypassed to the monitor without buffering or changing frequencies. Amber was also designed to work without expensive field memory as a simple scan doubler, but has not been marketed that way.

=== Vidiot ===
The Vidiot is a hybrid integrated circuit that works as digital-to-analog converter (DAC) for the OCS/ECS generation's 12-bit video to analog RGB output. It also generates a monochrome composite video signal and combined sync. The A3000 uses one Vidiot each for 15 kHz video and for 31 kHz (Amber) output. The A1000 uses discrete resistor arrays and amplification. The A600 and AGA Amigas use off-the-shelf DACs.
