= MOS Technology Agnus =

Custom Amiga chip

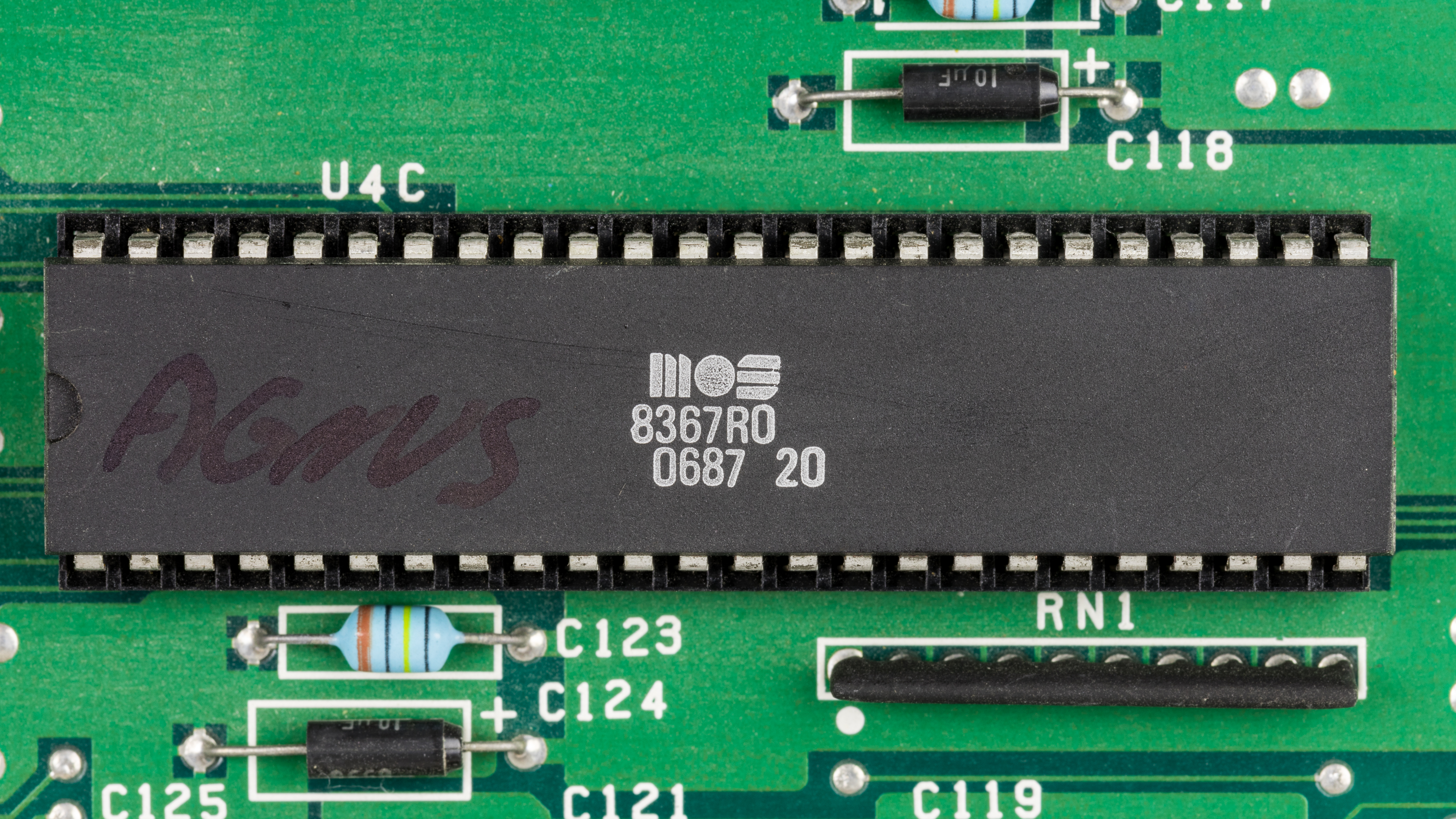
MOS 8367R0 – Agnus

The MOS Technology "Agnus", usually called Agnus, is an integrated circuit in the custom chipset of the Amiga computer. The Agnus, Denise and Paula chips collectively formed the OCS and ECS chipsets.

The Agnus is the Address Generator Chip. Its main function, in chip area, is the RAM Address Generator and Register Address Encoder which handles all DMA addresses. The 8361 Agnus is made up of approximately 21000 transistors and contains DMA Channel Controllers. The Blitter and Copper are also contained here. Originally Agnus was fabricated in 5 μm manufacturing process like all OCS chipset.

Agnus features:

- Memory controller ("Chip" memory that can be accessed by the processor and the chipset)
- The Blitter, a bitmap manipulator. The Blitter is capable of copying blocks of display data, or any arbitrary data in the chip memory, at high speed with various raster operations as well as drawing pixel perfect lines and filling outlined polygons, while freeing the CPU for concurrent tasks.
- "Copper", a display synchronized co-processor
- 25 Direct Memory Access (DMA) channels, allowing graphics, sound and I/O to be used with minimal CPU intervention
- DRAM refresh controller
- Generates the system clock from the 28 MHz oscillator
- Video timing

Agnus was replaced by Alice in the Amiga 4000 and Amiga 1200 when the AGA chipset was introduced in 1992.

== Chips by capability ==
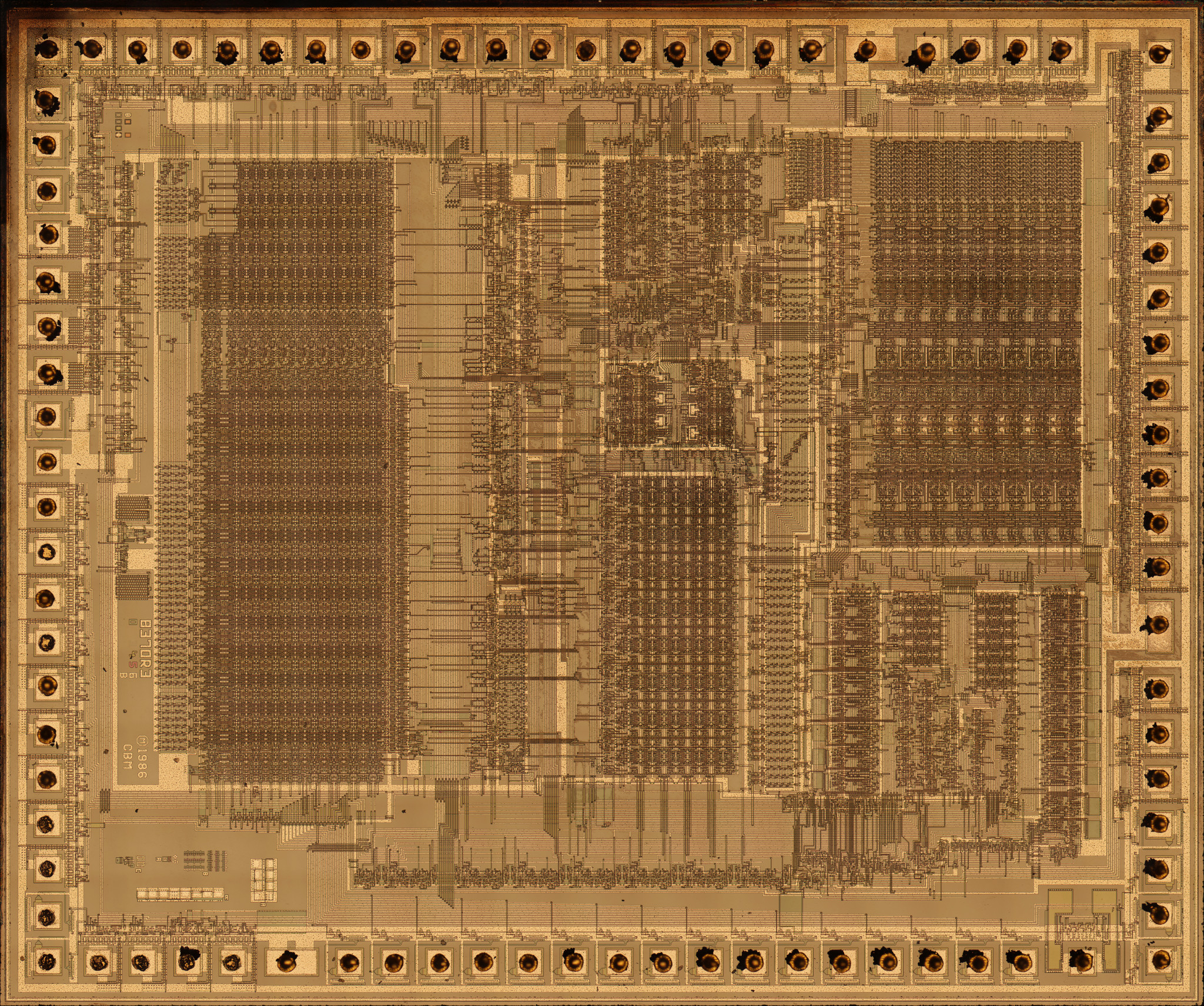
Agnus chip (MOS Technology 8370 R3)

- OCS Agnus which can address up to 512 KB of Chip RAM (PLCC versions add 512 KB of pseudo-fast RAM)
  - 8361 (DIP) - Amiga 1000 (NTSC); Amiga 2000 model A (NTSC)
  - 8367 (DIP) - Amiga 1000 (PAL); Amiga 2000 model A (PAL)
  - 8370 (PLCC) - Amiga 500 to Rev 5.x (NTSC); Amiga 2000 model B to Rev 4.5 (NTSC)
  - 8371 (PLCC) - Amiga 500 to Rev 5.x (PAL); Amiga 2000 model B to Rev 4.5 (PAL)
- ECS Agnus which can address up to 1 MB of Chip RAM
  - 8372 - no data*
  - 8372A - Amiga 500 from Rev 6 (NTSC/PAL); Amiga 2000 model B from Rev 6.0 to Rev 6.3 (NTSC/PAL); Commodore CDTV
  - 8375 (318069-16 only) (PAL) - Amiga 500 from Rev 6 (PAL); Amiga 2000 model B from Rev 6.4 (PAL)
  - 8375 (318069-17 only) (NTSC) - Amiga 500 from Rev 6 (NTSC); Amiga 2000 model B from Rev 6.4 (NTSC)
- ECS Agnus which can address up to 2 MB of Chip RAM
  - 8372AB - Amiga 3000 from Rev 6.1 to Rev 8.9 (NTSC/PAL)
  - 8372B - Amiga 3000 Rev 9 (NTSC/PAL)
  - 8375 (PAL) - Amiga 500 Plus; Amiga 600 (PAL)
  - 8375 (NTSC) - Amiga 600 (NTSC)

* Somewhere 8372A Agnus mentioned as simply "8372".

== Chips by package ==
- 48-lead DIP Agnus (aka thin Agnus): 8361; 8367
- 84-contact PLCC Fat Agnus (named Fat Lady on most Amiga 2000 motherboards) 8370; 8371; 8372; 8372A; 8372AB; 8372B; 8375

Notes
Fat Agnus 1MB and Fat Agnus 2MB also known as Super Agnus; Super Fat Agnus; Fatter Agnus; Big Agnus; Big Fat Agnus.

== DMA Channels ==
Priority	Name	Count	Cycles/Rasterline	Chip	Notes
	MPU	1	varying	CPU	
A	Blitter	4	varying	Agnus (internal)	yields 1/4 cycles to CPU when BLTPRI not active
B	Bitplane	6	80	Denise	impairs sprite channels on severe overscan
C	Copper	1	varying	Agnus (internal)	
D	Audio	4	4	Paula	
E	Sprites	8	16	Denise	
F	Disk	1	3	Paula	
G	Memory Refresh	1	4	-	
Reference: Amiga 500 plus Service Manual

== Pinout ==
=== PLCC versions ===
When replacing or upgrading chips, pinouts need to be taken care of. Types are just mentioned for reference; four-digit types and pinouts/usage are not consistent.

Pin	OCS/ECS	ECS		AGA (Alice)	Description
Pin	A500/2000	A3000	A500+/600	A4000/1200	Description
Pin	8370/1	8372	8375	8374	Description
1	RD13	DRD13	DRD13	DRD13	Data Bus 16 bit, bit 13
2	RD12	DRD12	DRD12	DRD12	...
3	RD11	DRD11	DRD11	DRD11	...
4	RD10	DRD10	DRD10	DRD10	...
5	RD9	DRD9	DRD9	DRD9	...
6	RD8	DRD8	DRD8	DRD8	...
7	RD7	DRD7	DRD7	DRD7	...
8	RD6	DRD6	DRD6	DRD6	...
9	RD5	DRD5	DRD5	DRD5	...
10	RD4	DRD4	DRD4	DRD4	...
11	RD3	DRD3	DRD3	DRD3	...
12	RD2	DRD2	DRD2	DRD2	...
13	RD1	DRD1	DRD1	DRD1	...
14	RD0	DRD0	DRD0	DRD0	Data Bus 16 bit, bit 0
15	Vcc	Vcc	Vcc	Vcc1	+5V ±5%
16	RST*	_RESET	_RESET	/RESET	Global RESETn, low active
17	INT3	_INTR	_INTR	/INTR	
18	DMAL	DMAL	DMAL	DMAL	
19	BLS*	_BLISS	_BLISS	/BLS	
20	DBR*	_BLIT	_BLIT	/DBR	
21	RRW	_WE	_WE	/WE	
22	PRW	R/W	R/W	R/W	
23	RGEN*	_REGEN	_REGEN	_REGEN	
24	AS*	_AS	_AS	NC2	
25	RAMEN*	_RAMEN	_RAMEN	/RAMEN	
26	RGA8	RGA8	RGA8	RGA8	
27	RGA7	RGA7	RGA7	RGA7	
28	RGA6	RGA6	RGA6	RGA6	
29	RGA5	RGA5	RGA5	RGA5	
30	RGA4	RGA4	RGA4	RGA4	
31	RGA3	RGA3	RGA3	RGA3	
32	RGA2	RGA2	RGA2	RGA2	
33	RGA1	RGA1	RGA1	RGA1	
34	28 MHz	28 MHz	28 MHz	SCLK	
35	XCLK	A20	A20	A20	
36	XCLKEN*	_XCLKEN	_CDAC	14 MHz	
37	CDAC*	_CDAC	7 MHz	/CDAC	
38	7 MHz	7 MHz	CCKQ	7 MHz	
39	CCKQ	CCKQ	CCK	CCKQ	
40	CCK	CCK	14M	CCK	
41	TEST	TEST	GND	/NTSC	
42	Vss	Vss1	DRA0	GND2	
43	MA0	DRA0	DRA1	DRA0	Memory address bus 9 bit, bit 0 (except 8375 which is bit 1)
44	MA1	DRA1	DRA2	DRA1	...
45	MA2	DRA2	DRA3	DRA2	...
46	MA3	DRA3	DRA4	DRA3	...
47	MA4	DRA4	DRA5	DRA4	...
48	MA5	DRA5	DRA6	DRA5	...
49	MA6	DRA6	DRA7	DRA6	...
50	MA7	DRA7	DRA8	DRA7	...
51	MA8	DRA8	_LDS	DRA8	Memory address bus 9 bit, bit 8 (except 8375 which is bit _LDS)
52	LDS*	_LDS	_UDS	Vcc2	
53	UDS*	_UDS	_CASL	NC1	
54	CASL*	_CASL	_CASU	/CAS	
55	CASU*	_CASU	DRA9	Vbb	
56	RAS1*	DRA9	_RAS1	DRA9	
57	RAS0*	_RAS	_RAS0	/RAS	
58	Vss	Vss2	GND	GND3	
59	A19	A19	A19	A19	
60	A1	A1	A1	A1	
61	A2	A2	A2	A2	
62	A3	A3	A3	A3	
63	A4	A4	A4	A4	
64	A5	A5	A5	A5	
65	A6	A6	A6	A6	
66	A7	A7	A7	A7	
67	A8	A8	A8	A8	
68	A9	A9	A9	A9	
69	A10	A10	A10	A10	
70	A11	A11	A11	A11	
71	A12	A12	A12	A12	
72	A13	A13	A13	A13	
73	A14	A14	A14	A14	
74	A15	A15	A15	A15	
75	A16	A16	A16	A16	
76	A17	A17	A17	A17	
77	A18	A18	A18	A18	
78	LP*	_LPEN	_LPEN	/LPEN	
79	VSY*	_VSYNC	_VSYNC	/VSYNC	
80	CSY*	_CSYNC	_CSYNC	/CSYNC	
81	HSY*	_HSYNC	_HSYNC	/HSYNC	
82	Vss	Vss3	GND	GND1	Ground, common on whole board
83	RD15	DRD15	DRD15	DRD15	Data Bus 16 bit, bit 15
84	RD14	DRD14	DRD14	DRD14	Data Bus 16 bit, bit 14

References: A500 Service Training, A3000 Service Manual, A500+ Service Manual, A1200 schematics
