= Amiga 500 =

Personal computer by Commodore

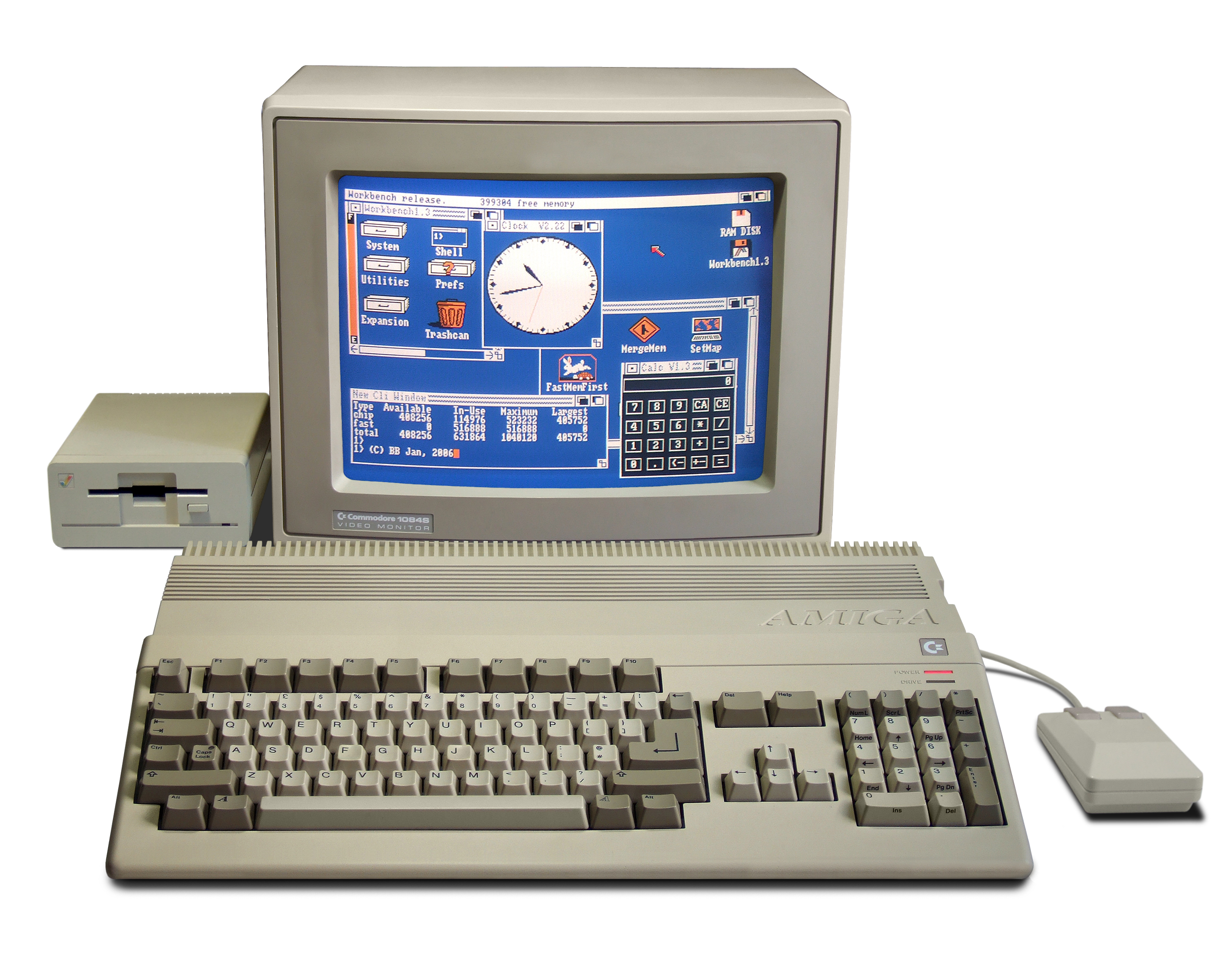
- A500 with 1084S monitor and Amiga 1010 external second floppy drive
- Developer: Commodore International
- Product family: Amiga
- Type: Home computer
- Released: April 1987 (Netherlands); May 1987 (Europe); October 1987 (US/UK)
- Introductory price: US$699 (equivalent to $1,980 in 2025); £499 (equivalent to £1,440 in 2025)
- Discontinued: 1992
- Units sold: 2.6 million 1,160,500 units in Germany (including Amiga 500 Plus sales)
- Media: 880 KB floppy disks
- Operating system: AmigaOS v1.2 – 1.3 (upgradable to current version if enough RAM is installed)
- CPU: Motorola 68000 @ 7.16 MHz (NTSC); 7.09 MHz (PAL)
- Memory: 512 or 1024 KB 150 ns (maximum 9 to 138 MB, depending on upgrades) (Note: Here, K, M, G, or T refer to the binary prefixes based on powers of 1024) (Note: Using existing hardware, an A500 can be expanded by an internal CPU board with up to 128 MB like a DCE Viper 530, 8 MB external Fast RAM, and 2 MB Agnus expansion.)
- Display: 736×567i 4 bpp (PAL); 736×483i 4 bpp (NTSC); 368×567i 6 bpp (PAL); 368×483i 6 bpp (NTSC)
- Graphics: Denise
- Sound: 4× 8-bit channels PCM at max. 28 kHz with 6-bit volume in stereo
- Dimensions: (cm): 6.2 x 47.4 x 33 (inches): 2 7/16 x 18 11/16 x 13
- Predecessor: Amiga 1000
- Successor: Amiga 500 Plus; Amiga 600

The Amiga 500, also known as the A500, was the first popular version of the Amiga home computer. It contains the same Motorola 68000 as the Amiga 1000, as well as the same graphics and sound coprocessors, but is in a smaller case similar to that of the Commodore 128. Released in 1987, the Amiga 500 was the first computer for the home market capable of multitasking. In addition, it featured rich color graphics at a time when most high-end computer systems like the IBM PC and the original Macintosh either had limited color or were entirely monochrome.

Commodore announced the Amiga 500 at the January 1987 winter Consumer Electronics Show – at the same time as the high-end Amiga 2000. It was initially available in the Netherlands in April 1987, then the rest of Europe in May. In North America and the UK it was released in October 1987 with a US$699/£499 list price. It competed directly against models in the Atari ST line.

The Amiga 500 was sold in the same retail outlets as the Commodore 64, as opposed to the computer store-only Amiga 1000. It proved to be Commodore's best-selling model, particularly in Europe. Although popular with hobbyists, arguably its most widespread use was as a gaming machine, where its graphics and sound were of significant benefit. It was followed by a revised version of the computer, the Amiga 500 Plus, and the 500 series was discontinued in 1992.

== Releases ==
In mid-1988, the Amiga 500 dropped its price from £499 to £399, and it was later bundled with the Batman Pack in the United Kingdom (from October 1989 to September 1990) which included the games Batman, F/A-18 Interceptor, The New Zealand Story and the bitmap graphics editor Deluxe Paint 2. Also included was the Amiga video connector, which allows the A500 to be used with a conventional CRT television.

In November 1991, the enhanced Amiga 500 Plus replaced the 500 in some markets. It was bundled with the Cartoon Classics pack in the United Kingdom at £399, although many stores still advertised it as an 'A500'. The Amiga 500 Plus was virtually identical except for its new operating system, integrated 1MB of Chip memory, different 'trap-door' expansion slot and slightly different keyboard, and in mid-1992, the two were discontinued and effectively replaced by the Amiga 600. In late 1992, Commodore released the Amiga 1200, a machine closer in concept to the original Amiga 500, but with significant technical improvements. Despite this, neither the A1200 nor the A600 replicated the commercial success of its predecessor. By this time, the home market was strongly shifting to IBM PC compatibles with VGA graphics and the low-cost Macintosh Classic, LC, and IIsi models.

== Description ==
Outwardly resembling the Commodore 128 and codenamed "Rock Lobster" during development, the Amiga 500's base houses a keyboard and a CPU in one shell, unlike the Amiga 1000. The keyboard for Amiga 500s sold in the United States contains 94 keys, including ten function keys, four cursor keys, and a number pad. All European versions the keyboard have an additional two keys, except for the British variety, which still uses 94 keys. It uses a Motorola 68000 microprocessor running at 7.15909 MHz in NTSC regions and 7.09379 MHz in PAL regions. The CPU implements a 32-bit model and has 32-bit registers, but it has a 16-bit main ALU and uses a 16-bit external data bus and a 24-bit address bus, providing a maximum of 16 MB of address space. Also built in to the base of the computer is a 3 1/2-inch floppy disk drive. The user can also install up to three external floppy drives, either 3 1/2- or 5 1/4-inch, via the disk drive port. The second and third additional drives are installed by daisy-chaining them. Supported by these drives are double-sided disks with a capacity of 901,120 bytes, as well as 360- and 720-KB disks formatted for IBM PC compatibles.

The earliest Amiga 500 models use nearly the same Original Amiga chipset as the Amiga 1000. (Note: Agnus was enhanced to control up to 1 MB RAM and glue logic was integrated into Gary to reduce costs.) So graphics can be displayed in multiple resolutions and color depths, even on the same screen. Resolutions vary from 320×200 (up to 32 colors) to 640×400 (up to 16 colors) for NTSC (704×484 overscan) and 320×256 to 640×512 for PAL (704×576 overscan.) The system uses planar graphics, with up to five bitplanes (four in high resolution) allowing 2-, 4-, 8-, 16-, and 32-color screens, from a palette of 4096 colors. Two special graphics modes are also available: Extra HalfBrite, which uses a sixth bitplane as a mask to cut the brightness of any pixel in half (resulting in 32 arbitrary colors plus 32 more colors set at half the value of the first 32), and Hold-And-Modify (HAM) which allows all 4096 colors to be used on screen simultaneously. Later revisions of the chipset are PAL/NTSC switchable in software.

The sound chip produces four hardware-mixed channels, two to the left and two to the right, of 8-bit PCM at a sampling frequency up to 28 kHz. Each hardware channel has its own independent volume level and sampling rate, and can be designated to another channel where it can modulate both volume and frequency using its own output. With DMA disabled it's possible to output with a sampling frequency up to 56 kHz. There is a common trick to output sound with 14-bit precision that can be combined to output 14-bit 56 kHz sound.

The stock system comes with AmigaOS version 1.2 or 1.3 and 512 KB of chip RAM (150 ns access time), one built-in double-density standard floppy disk drive that is completely programmable and can read 720 KB IBM PC disks, 880 KB standard Amiga disks, and up to 984 KB using custom-formatting drivers.

Despite the lack of Amiga 2000-compatible internal expansion slots, there are many ports and expansion options. There are two DE9M Atari joystick ports for joysticks or mice, and stereo audio RCA connectors (1 V p-p). There is a floppy drive port for daisy-chaining up to three extra floppy disk drives via a DB23F connector. The then-standard RS-232 serial port (DB25M) and Centronics parallel port (DB25F) are also included. The power supply is (+5 V, ±12 V). The system displays video in analog RGB 50 Hz PAL or 60 Hz NTSC through a proprietary DB23M connector and in NTSC mode the line frequency is 15.75 kHz HSync for standard video modes, which is compatible with NTSC television and CVBS/RGB video, but out of range for most VGA-compatible monitors, while a multisync monitor is required for some of the higher resolutions. This connection can also be genlocked to an external video signal. The system was bundled with an RF adapter to provide output on televisions with a coaxial RF input, while monochrome video is available via an RCA connector (also coaxial). On the left side, behind a plastic cover, there is a Zorro (Zorro I) bus expansion external edge connector with 86 pins. Peripherals such as a hard disk drive can be added via the expansion slot and are configured automatically by the Amiga's AutoConfig standard, so that multiple devices do not conflict with each other. Up to 8 MB of so-called "fast RAM" (memory that can be accessed by the CPU only) can be added using the side expansion slot. This connector is electronically identical with the Amiga 1000's, but swapped on the other side.

The Amiga 500 has a "trap-door" slot on the underside for a RAM upgrade (typically 512 KB). This extra RAM is classified as "fast" RAM, but is sometimes referred to as "slow" RAM: due to the design of the expansion bus, it is actually on the chipset bus. Such upgrades usually include a battery-backed real-time clock. All versions of the A500 can have the additional RAM configured as chip RAM by a simple hardware modification, which involves fitting a later model (8372A) Agnus chip. Likewise, all versions of the A500 can be upgraded to 2 MB chip RAM by fitting the 8372B Agnus chip and adding additional memory.

The Amiga 500 also sports an unusual feature for a budget machine, socketed chips, which allow easy replacement of defective chips. The CPU can be directly upgraded on the motherboard to a 68010; or to a 68020, 68030, or 68040 via the side expansion slot; or by removing the CPU and plugging a CPU expansion card into the CPU socket (this requires opening the computer and thus voided any remaining warranty). In fact, all the custom chips can be upgraded to the Amiga Enhanced Chip Set (ECS) versions.

The plastic case is made of acrylonitrile butadiene styrene, or ABS. ABS degrades with time due to exposure to oxygen, causing a yellowing of the case. Other factors contributing to the degradation and yellowing include heat, shear, and ultraviolet light. The yellowing can be reversed by using an optical brightener, though without stabilizing agents or antioxidants to block oxygen, the yellowing will return.

== Technical specifications ==
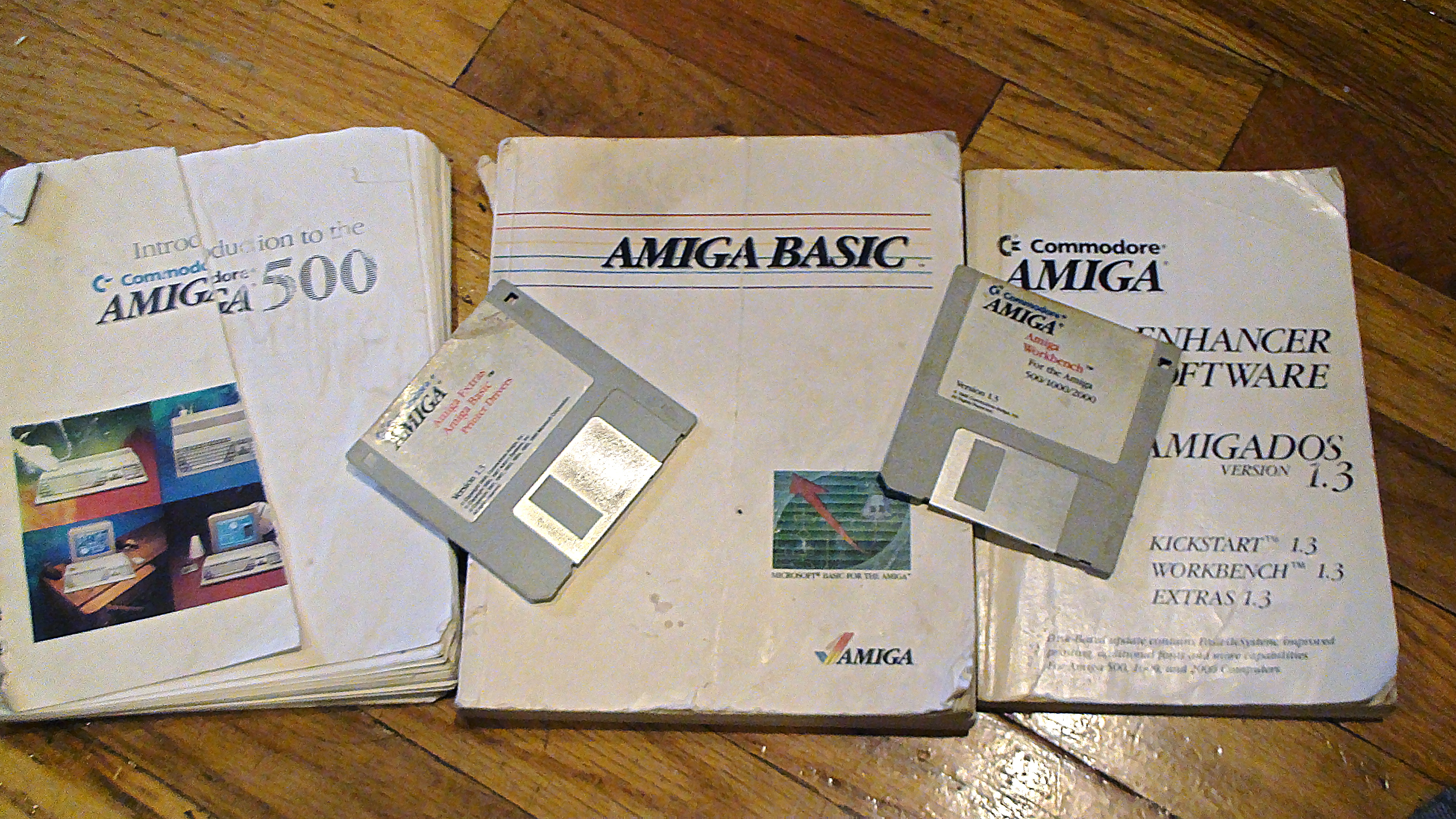
The standard Amiga 500 requires floppies to boot.

- OCS (1.2 and 1.3 models) or ECS (1.3 and 500+ 2.04 models) chipset. ECS revisions of the chipset made PAL/NTSC mode switchable in software.
  - Sound: 4 hardware-mixed channels of 8-bit sound at up to 28 kHz. The hardware channels have independent volumes (65 levels) and sampling rates, and are mixed down to two fully left and fully right stereo outputs. A software controllable low-pass audio filter is also included.
- 512 KB of chip RAM (150 ns access time)
- AmigaOS 1.2 or 1.3 (upgradeable up to 3.1.4 if 2 MB of RAM are installed)
- One 3.5" double-density floppy disk drive is built in, which is completely programmable and thus can read 720 KB IBM PC disks, 880 KB standard Amiga disks, and up to 984 KB with custom formatting (such as Klaus Deppich's diskspare.device). Uses 300 rpm (5 rotations/second) and 250 kbit/s.
- Built-in keyboard
- A two-button mouse is included.

=== Graphics ===
- PAL mode: 768×580 maximum (overscan interlaced if viewed on composite monitor/TV). Typical resolutions: 320×256, 640×256 or 640×512 (all displayed with borders).
- NTSC mode: 768×484 maximum (overscan interlaced if viewed on composite monitor/TV). Typical resolutions: 320×200, 640×200 or 640×400 (all displayed with borders).
- Graphics can be of arbitrary dimensions, resolution and colour depth, even on the same screen. The Amiga can show multiple resolution modes at the same time, splitting the screen vertically.
- Planar graphics are used, with up to five bitplanes (four in hires); this allowed 2, 4, 8, 16 and 32 colour screens, from a palette of 4096 colours.
- Two special graphics modes are also included:
  - Extra Half Brite (EHB), which uses a sixth bitplane as a mask that halved the brightness of any colour seen
  - Hold-And-Modify (HAM), which allows all 4096 colours on screen at once. HAM makes it possible to use 12 bpp over a 3 pixel wide span. This works by letting each pixel position use the previous RGB value and modify one of the red, green or blue values to a new 4-bit value. This will cause some negligible colour artifacts however.

=== Memory ===
Using various expansion techniques, the A500's total RAM can reach up to 138 MB – 2 MB Chip RAM, 8 MB 16-bit Fast RAM, and 128 MB 32-bit Fast RAM.

==== Chip RAM ====
The stock 512 KB Chip RAM can be complemented by 512 KB using a "trapdoor" expansion (Commodore A501 or compatible). While that expansion memory is connected to the chip bus, hardware limitations of early stock Agnus chip revisions prevent its use as Chip RAM, only the CPU can access it. Suffering from the same contention limitations as Chip RAM, that memory is known as "Slow RAM" or "Pseudo-fast RAM". Agnus revisions shipped with late A500 are ECS and allow use of trapdoor RAM as real Chip RAM for a total 1 MB.

Additionally, several third-party expansions exist with up to 2 MB on the trapdoor board. Using a Gary adapter, that memory will be mapped as either split on Chip RAM and Slow RAM or fully as Slow RAM, depending on configuration.

Furthermore, using an A3000 Agnus on an adapter board, it is possible to expand the Chip RAM to 2 MB, matching the A500+.

==== Fast RAM ====
"Fast" RAM is located on the CPU-side bus. Its access is exclusive to the CPU and not slowed by any chipset access. The side expansion port allows for up to 8 MB of Zorro-style expansion RAM. Alternatively, a CPU adapter allows for internal expansion.

==== Accelerator RAM ====
Internal or external CPU accelerators often include their own expansion memory. 16-bit CPUs are limited by the 24-bit address space but they can repurpose otherwise unused memory space for their included RAM. 32-bit CPU accelerators aren't limited by 24-bit addressing and can include up to 128 MB of Fast RAM (and potentially more).

==== Memory map ====
Amiga system memory map
Address	Size in KB	Description
0x00 0000	256	Chip RAM
0x04 0000	256	Chip RAM (A1000 option card)
0x08 0000	512	Chip RAM expansion
0x10 0000	1024	Extended Chip RAM for ECS/AGA
0x20 0000	8192	Primary auto-config space (Fast RAM)
0xA0 0000	1984	Reserved
0xBF D000	3.8	8520-B (even-byte addresses)
0xBF E001	3.8	8520-A (odd-byte addresses)
0xC0 0000	1536	Internal expansion memory (pseudo-fast, "slow" RAM on Amiga 500)
0xD8 0000	256	Reserved
0xDC 0000	64	Real time clock
0xDD 0000	188	Reserved
0xDF F000	4	Custom chip registers
0xE0 0000	512	Reserved
0xE8 0000	64	Zorro II auto-config space (before relocation)
0xE9 0000	448	Secondary auto-config space (usually 64K I/O boards)
0xF0 0000	512	512K System ROM (reserved for extended ROM image e.g. CDTV or CD^{32})
0xF8 0000	256	256K System ROM (Kickstart 2.04 or higher)
0xFC 0000	256	256K System ROM

=== Connectors ===
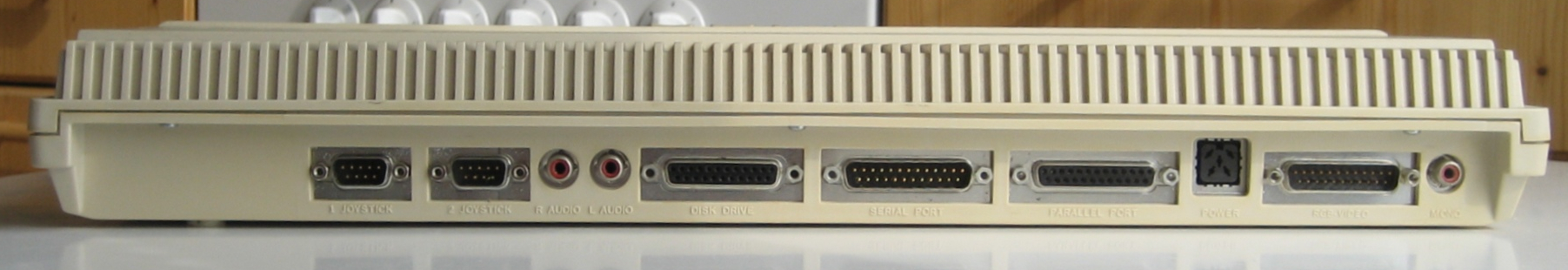
Backside of the base of the Amiga 500. From left to right, it features two Atari joystick ports, two audio connectors, a floppy drive port, a serial and a parallel port, a power input, and two separate inputs for RGB and monochrome monitors.

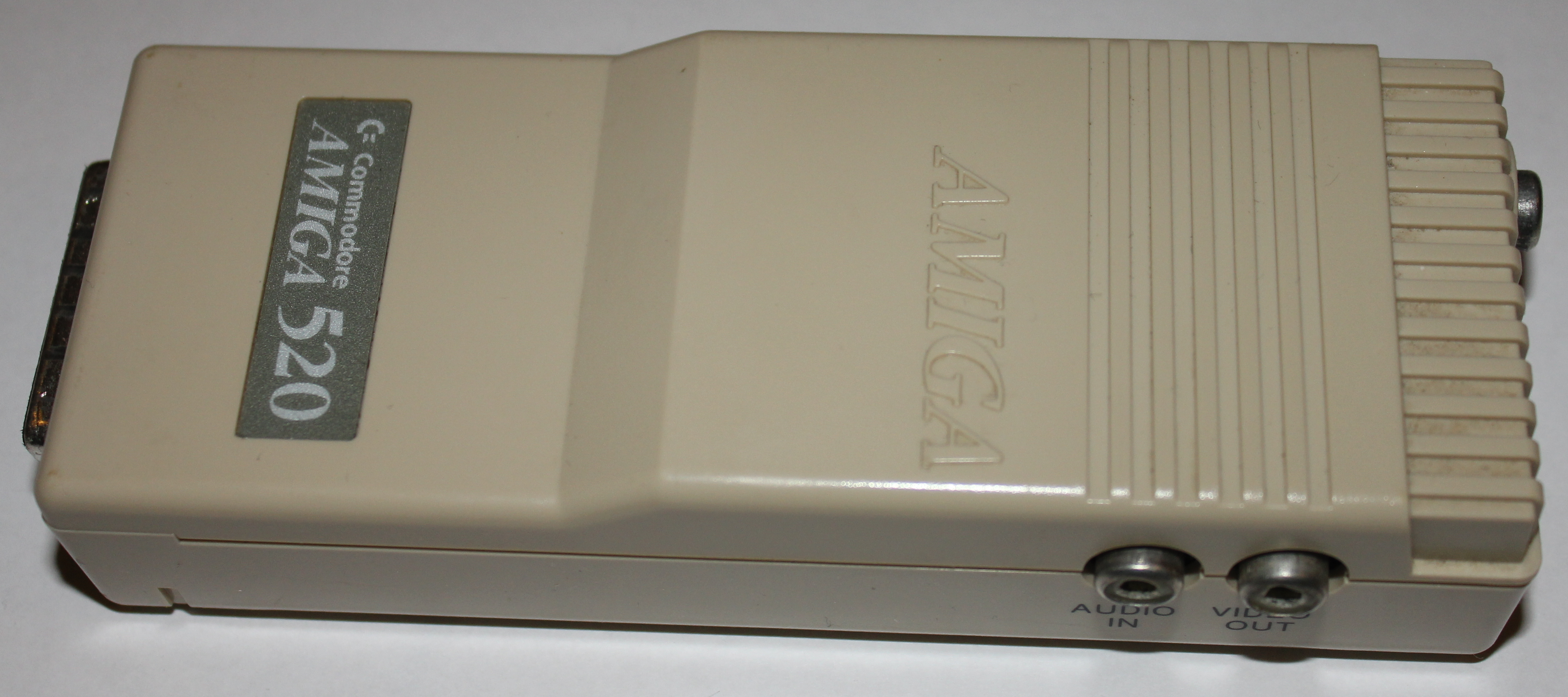
The Amiga 520 adapter allows for an RF modulated output to be connected to a TV, or composite output to a monitor.

- Two Atari joystick ports for joysticks or mice
- Stereo audio RCA connectors (1 V p-p)
- A floppy drive port (DB23F), for daisy-chaining up to 3 extra floppy disk drives via a DB23F connector
- A standard RS-232 serial port (DB25M)
- A parallel port (DB25F)
- Power inlet (+5 V, ±12 V)
- Amiga video connector: Analogue RGB 50 Hz PAL and 60 Hz NTSC video output, provided on an Amiga-specific DB23M connector. Can drive video with 15.75 kHz HSync for standard Amiga video modes. This is not compatible with most VGA monitors. A Multisync monitor is required for some higher resolutions. This connection can also be genlocked to an external video signal. An RF adapter (A520) was frequently bundled with the machine to provide output on regular televisions or on composite monitors. A digital 16 colour Red-Green-Blue-Intensity signal is available too on the same connector.
- Monochrome video via an RCA connector
- Zorro II bus expansion on the left side behind a plastic cover
- Trapdoor slot under the machine, for RAM expansion and real-time clock

=== Expansions ===
- Expansion ports are limited to a side expansion port and a trapdoor expansion on the underside of the machine. The casing can also be opened up (voiding the warranty), all larger chips are socketed rather than being TH/SMD soldered directly to the motherboard, so they can be replaced by hand.
- The CPU can be upgraded to a Motorola 68010 directly or to a 68020, 68030 or 68040 via the side expansion slot or a CPU socket adapter board.
- The chip RAM can be upgraded to 1 MB directly on the motherboard, provided a Fat Agnus chip is also installed to support it.
- Likewise, all the custom chips can be upgraded to the ECS chipset.
- The A500+ model instead allowed upgrading by 1 MB trapdoor chip RAM without clock, but there was no visible means on board to map any of this as FAST, causing incompatibility with some stubbornly coded programs.
- There were modification instructions available for the A500 to solder or socket another 512 KB RAM on the board, then run extra address lines to the trapdoor slot to accommodate an additional 1 MB of fast or chip RAM depending on the installed chipset.
- Up to 8 MB of "fast RAM" can be added via the side expansion slot, even more if an accelerator with a non-EC (without reduced data/address bus) processor and 32-bit RAM is used.
- Hard drive and other peripherals can be added via the side expansion slot.
- Several companies provided combined CPU, memory and hard drive upgrades – or provided chainable expansions that extended the bus as they were added – as there is only one side expansion slot.
- Expansions are configured automatically by AutoConfig software, so multiple pieces of hardware did not conflict with each other.

=== Diagnostics ===
When the computer is powered on, a self-diagnostic test is run from the Kickstart ROM. The video output should switch through dark gray, light gray and white to indicate progress in the test. Failure is indicated by filling the monitor with a specific colour:

1. Medium green means chip RAM is not found or is damaged.
2. Red means there is a Kickstart ROM problem.
3. Yellow means the CPU has crashed (no trap routine or trying to run bad code) or a bad Zorro expansion card.
4. Blue means a custom chip problem (Denise, Paula, or Agnus).
5. Light green means a CIA problem.
6. (permanent) Light gray means that the CIA might be defective.
7. Black and white stripes mean there is a ROM or CIA problem.
8. Black-only (no video) means there is no video output.

Failure is also communicated by blinking the keyboard's caps lock indicator light:

1. One blink means that the keyboard ROM has a checksum error.
2. Two blinks means a RAM failure.
3. Three blinks means a watchdog timer failure.

== Trap-door expansion 501 ==
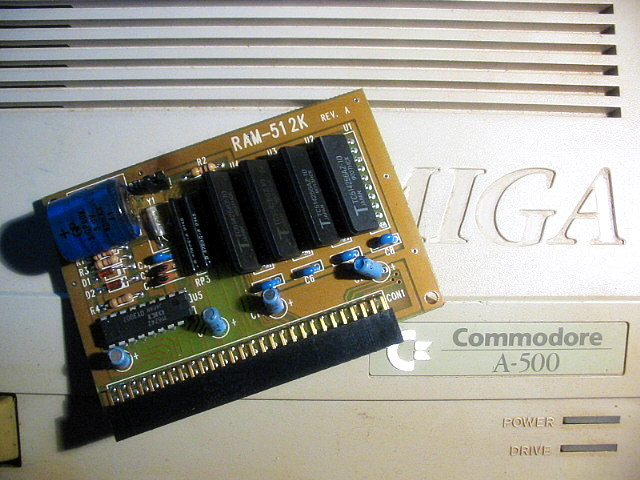
An A501 compatible expansion

A popular expansion for the Amiga 500 was the Amiga 501 circuit board that can be installed underneath the computer behind a plastic cover. The expansion contains 512 KB RAM configured by default as "Slow RAM" or "trap-door RAM" and a battery-backed real-time clock (RTC).

The 512 KB trap-door RAM and 512 KB of original chip RAM will result in 1 MB of total memory. The added memory is known as "Slow RAM", as its access is impacted by chip-bus bandwidth contention, while the chipset is not actually able to address it.

Later revisions of the motherboard provide solder-jumpers to relocate the trap-door RAM to the chip memory pool, given the Agnus chip is the newer ECS version, shipped in later A500 motherboards. Newest (rev 8) A500s would share motherboard with A500+, and configure the expansion memory as CHIP by default.

== Software ==
Each time the Amiga 500 is booted, it executes code from the Kickstart ROM. The Amiga 500 initially came shipped with AmigaOS 1.2, but units since October 1988 had version 1.3 installed.

== Reception and sales ==
The Amiga 500 was the best-selling model in the Amiga family of computers. The German computer magazine Chip awarded the model the annual "Home Computer of the Year" title three consecutive times. At the European Computer Trade Show 1991, it also won the Leisure Award for the similar "Home Computer of the Year" title.

Owing to the inexpensive cost of the Amiga 500 in then price-sensitive Europe, sales of the Amiga family of computers were strongest there, constituting 85 percent of Commodore's total sales in the fourth quarter of 1990. The Amiga 500 was widely perceived as a gaming machine and the Amiga 2000 a computer for artists and hobbyists.

It has been claimed that Commodore sold as many as six million units worldwide. However, Commodore UK refuted that figure and said that the entire Amiga line sold between four and five million computers. Indeed, Ars Technica provides a year-by-year graph of the sales of all Amiga computers.

The machine is reported to have sold 1,160,500 units in Germany (including Amiga 500 Plus sales).

== Amiga 500 Plus ==
Commodore Amiga 500 Plus
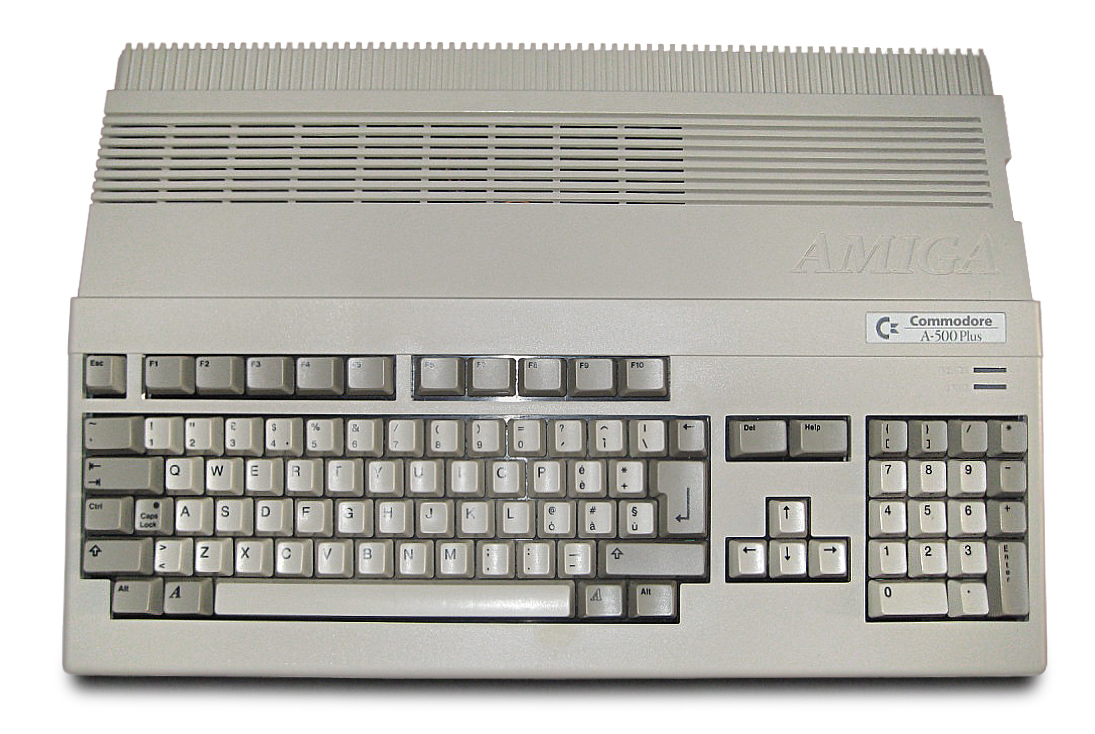
- Base of the Amiga 500 Plus, with the Italian variant of the keyboard
- Developer: Commodore International
- Product family: Amiga
- Type: Home computer
- Released: October 1991; 34 years ago (UK)
- Discontinued: June 1992; 34 years ago
- Media: 880 KB floppy disks
- Operating system: AmigaOS v2.04
- CPU: Motorola 68000 @ 7.16 MHz (NTSC); 7.09 MHz (PAL)
- Memory: 1 MB (10 MB maximum)
- Display: 640×256, 4 bpp @ 50 Hz (PAL); 640×200, 4 bpp @ 60 Hz (NTSC)
- Sound: 4× 8-bit channels PCM at max. 28 kHz with 6-bit volume in stereo
- Predecessor: Amiga 500
- Successor: Amiga 600

The Amiga 500 Plus (often A500 Plus or simply A500+) is a revised version of the original Amiga 500 computer. The A500+ featured minor changes to the motherboard to make it cheaper to produce than the original A500. It was notable for introducing new versions of Kickstart and Workbench, and for some minor improvements in the custom chips, known as the Enhanced Chip Set (or ECS).

Although officially introduced in 1992, some Amiga 500 units sold in late 1991 actually featured the revised motherboard used in the A500+. Although the Amiga 500+ was an improvement to the Amiga 500, it was minor. It was discontinued and replaced by the Amiga 600 in summer 1992, making it the shortest-lived Amiga model.

=== Compatibility problems ===
Due to the new Kickstart v2.04, quite a few popular games (such as Treasure Island Dizzy, Lotus Esprit Turbo Challenge, and SWIV) failed to work on the Amiga 500+, and some people took them back to dealers demanding an original Kickstart 1.3 Amiga 500. This problem was largely solved by third parties who produced Kickstart ROM switching boards, that could allow the Amiga 500+ to be downgraded to Kickstart 1.2 or 1.3. It also encouraged game developers to use better programming habits, which was important since Commodore already had plans for the introduction of the next-generation Amiga 1200 computer. A program, Relokick, was also released (and included with an issue of CU Amiga) which loaded a Kickstart 1.3 ROM image into memory and booted the machine into Kickstart 1.3, allowing most incompatible software to run (the software did take up 512 KB of system memory, meaning that some 1 MB only games would now fail for lack of available memory). In some cases, updated compatible versions of games were later released, such as budget versions of Lotus 1 and SWIV, and an update to Bubble Bobble. Double Dragon 2 by Binary Design received an update for ECS machines with the "Amiga phase-alternated linescan version 4.01/ECS". This solved compatibility issues with the graphics which appeared garbled on ECS machines, and it also slashed the in-game loading times from around 20 seconds to just over 6.

=== Technical specifications ===
- Motorola 68000 CPU running at 7.09 MHz (PAL) / 7.16 MHz (NTSC), like its predecessor
- 1 MB of Chip RAM (very early versions came with 512 KB)
- Kickstart 2.04 (v37.175)
- Workbench 37.67 (release 2.04)
- Built-in battery backed RTC (Real Time Clock)
- Full ECS chipset including new version of the Agnus chip and Denise chip

== See also ==
- List of Amiga models and variants
- Minimig – an open-source hardware FPGA implementation
