= Amiga 2000 =

Personal computer from Commodore, 1987

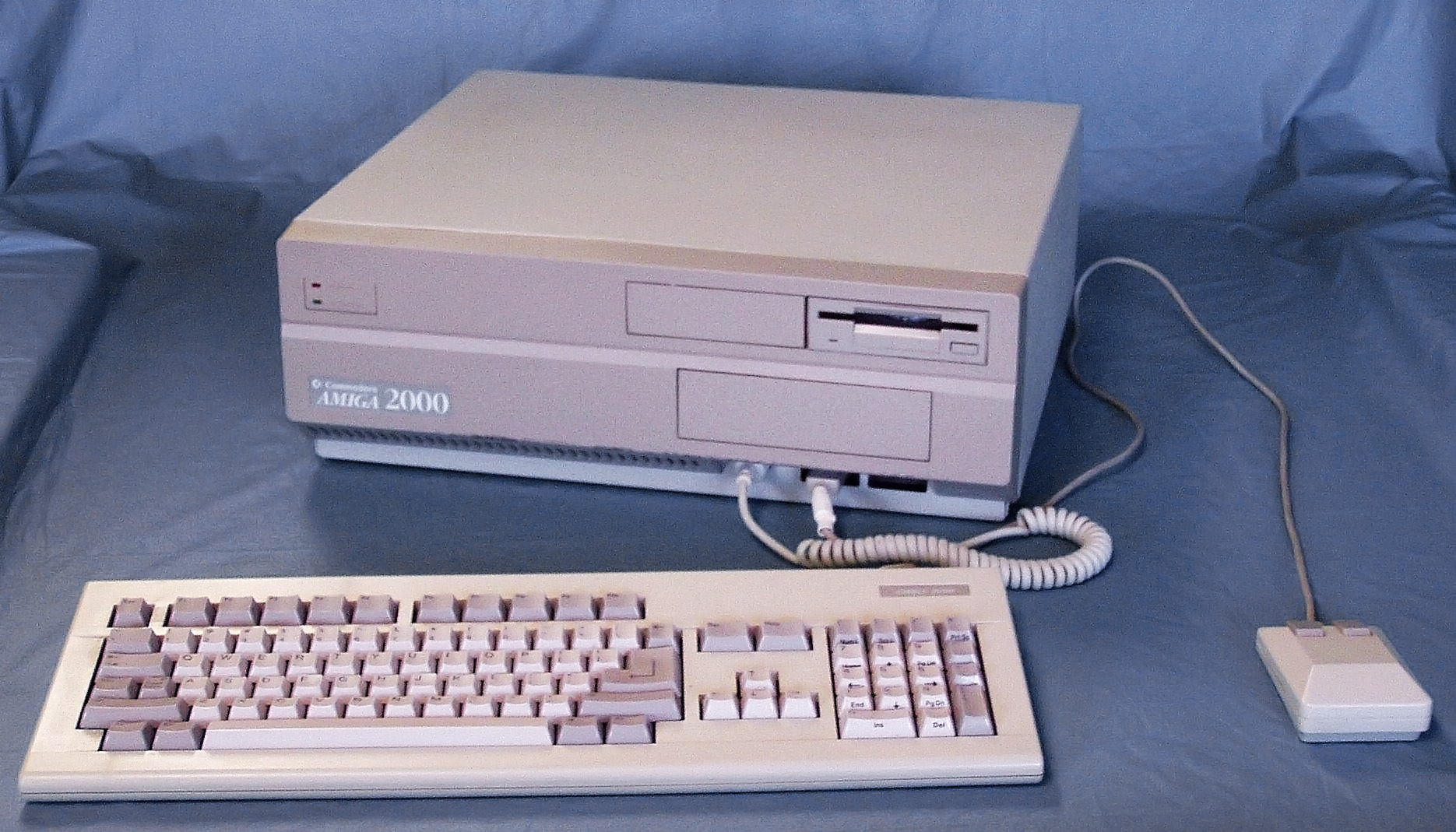
- Type: Personal computer
- Released: March 1987; 39 years ago
- Introductory price: USD 1,495 (1987); USD 4,200 (2025 equivalent)
- Discontinued: 1991
- Units sold: 124,500 units in Germany
- Operating system: Amiga OS 1.2/1.3 or 2.0
- CPU: Motorola 68000 @ 7.16 MHz (NTSC) 7.09 MHz (PAL)
- Memory: 1 MB (9 MB maximum)
- Predecessor: Amiga 1000
- Successor: Amiga 3000

The Amiga 2000 (A2000) is a personal computer released by Commodore in March 1987. It was introduced as a "big box" expandable variant of the Amiga 1000 but quickly redesigned to share most of its electronic components with the contemporary Amiga 500 for cost reduction. Expansion capabilities include two 3.5" drive bays (one of which is used by the included floppy drive) and one 5.25" bay that could be used by a 5.25" floppy drive (for IBM PC compatibility), a hard drive, or CD-ROM once they became available.

The Amiga 2000 is the first Amiga model that allows expansion cards to be added internally. SCSI host adapters, memory cards, CPU cards, network cards, graphics cards, serial port cards, and PC compatibility cards were available, and multiple expansions can be used simultaneously without requiring an expansion cage like the Amiga 1000 does. Not only does the Amiga 2000 include five Zorro II card slots, the motherboard also has four PC ISA slots, two of which are inline with Zorro II slots for use with the A2088 bridgeboard, which adds IBM PC XT compatibility to the A2000.

The Amiga 2000 was the most versatile and expandable Amiga computer until the Amiga 3000 was introduced three years later.

The machine is reported to have sold 124,500 units in Germany.

== Features ==
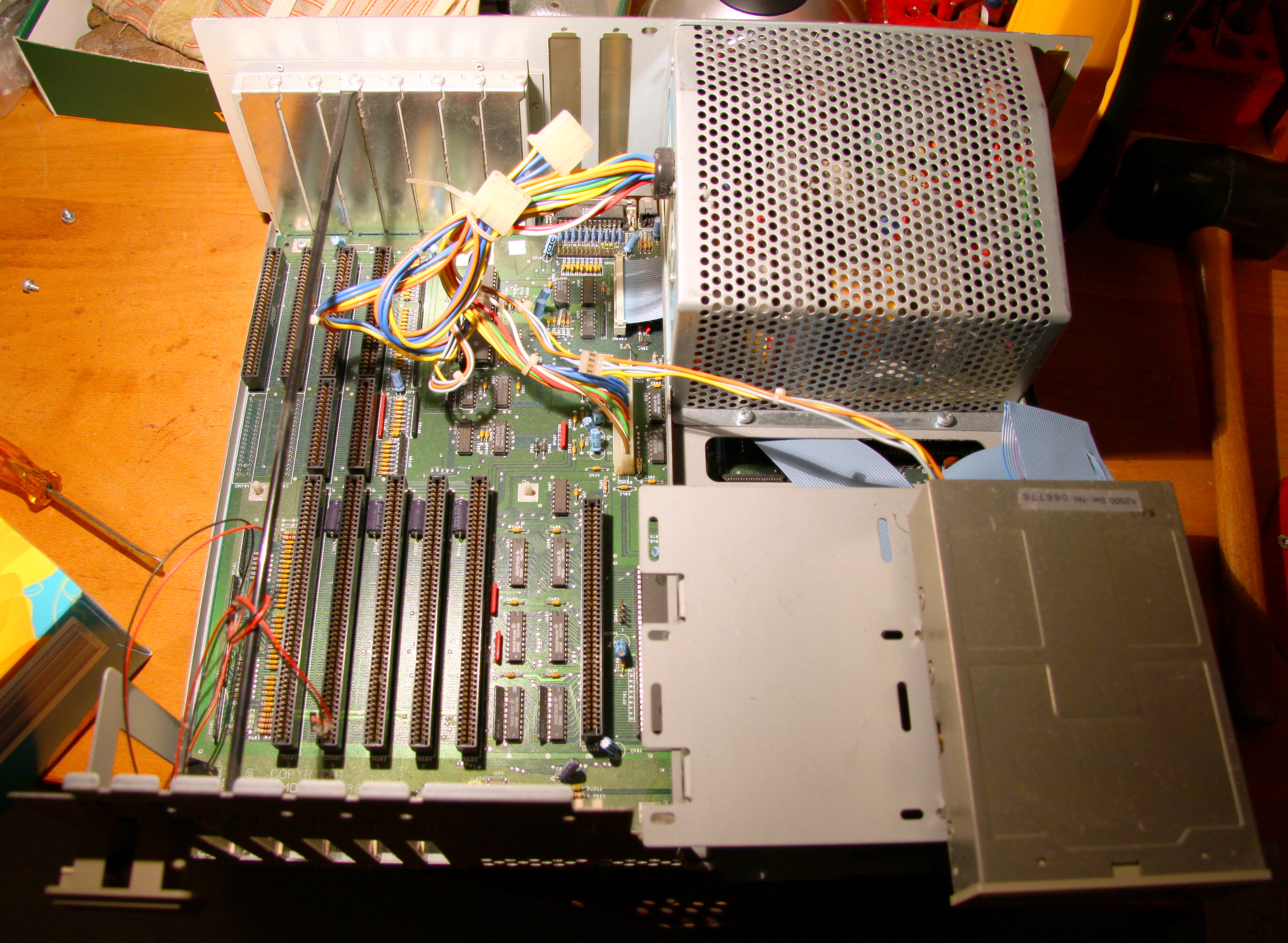
Inside of the Amiga 2000 (hardware revision 6.2). The third and fourth slots from the left are bridge slots, with Zorro II connectors inline with ISA connectors.

Recording of an Amiga 2000 loading a game from disk

Aimed at the high-end market, the original Europe-only model adds a Zorro II backplane, implemented in programmable logic, to the custom Amiga chipset used in the Amiga 1000. Later improved models have redesigned hardware using the more highly integrated Amiga 500 chipset, with the addition of a gate-array called "Buster", which integrates the Zorro subsystem. This also enables hand-off of the system control to a coprocessor slot device, and implements the full video slot for add-on video devices.

Like the earlier Amiga 1000 and most IBM PC compatibles of the era (but unlike the Amiga 500), the A2000 comes in a desktop case with a separate keyboard. The case is taller than the A1000 to accommodate expansion cards, two 3.5" and one 5.25" drive bays. The A2000's case lacks the "keyboard garage" of the Amiga 1000 but has space for five Zorro II expansion slots, two 16-bit and two 8-bit ISA slots, a CPU upgrade slot and a video slot. Unlike the A1000, the A2000's motherboard includes a battery-backed real-time clock.

The Amiga 2000 offers graphics capabilities exceeded among its contemporaries only by the Macintosh II, which sold for about twice the price of a comparably-outfitted Amiga 2000 additionally equipped with the IBM PC Compatible bridgeboard and 5.25" floppy disk drive (which was important for real-world interoperability at this time). Also like the A1000, the A2000 was sold only by specialty computer dealers. It was originally announced at a price of 1495 USD.

== Variants ==
The Amiga 2000 was designed with an open architecture. Commodore's engineers believed that the company would probably be unsuccessful in matching the rate of system obsolesce and replacement then common in the PC industry, with new models every year or so. Commodore's approach was to build a single system architecture that could span different models. Commodore was so successful at this that Info magazine judged that the A2000 would not become obsolete "until well after the turn of the century" at the earliest.

The final design was the result of an internal battle within Commodore, which pitted the USA division, who wanted to build a system more like the Amiga 3000 (and 1000), against the German division, which was fresh from the successful introduction of the first Commodore PC-compatible systems and planned to include this capability in the Amiga 2000 from the start. The bottom-line practicality of the German design won out, and the final A2000 shipped with not only Zorro II slots, but a complement of PC standard (for the day) ISA slots.

This architecture was subject to major revisions. The original motherboard was based on the previous Amiga 1000 with the addition of expansion slots, and so suffered all the same limitations. This was soon replaced by the "B2000-CR" version designed by Dave Haynie and Terry Fisher (whose names are printed on the board), which was instead based on the Amiga 500's improved design. The practical differences are that the early 2000 motherboard only has 512 kilobytes of ram installed, cannot be upgraded with newer versions of the chipset, requires the original processor to be removed when installing a processor card, and cannot use a video slot mounted flicker fixer.

The original Amiga 2000 shipped with just a single floppy drive for storage. This was followed up fairly early by the Amiga 2000/HD, which bundled an Amiga 2090 hard drive controller and a SCSI-based hard drive. In 1988, Commodore shipped the Amiga 2500/20, which added the Amiga 2620 CPU card to the CPU slot, a 14.3 MHz 68020, a 68881 FPU, and a 68851 MMU to the A2000, along with 2 MB of 32-bit-wide memory. The A2000's original 68000 CPU remained installed on the motherboard of these machines and could be switched to by holding down the right mouse button when powering on the computer for better compatibility. In 1989 this model was replaced by the Amiga 2500/30, which added an Amiga 2630 CPU card: 25 MHz 68030 and the 68882 FPU with up to 4 MB of 32-bit memory. The A2630 card can also take a memory expansion daughter card, capable of supporting up to 64 MB of additional memory. Commodore built an in-house prototype of this, but never released one.

=== Amiga 1500 ===
Amiga 1500
- Type: Personal computer
- Released: 1990; 36 years ago
- Introductory price: £999
- Operating system: Kickstart 1.3 / AmigaOS 1.3
- CPU: Motorola 68000 @ 7.16 MHz (NTSC) 7.09 MHz (PAL)
- Memory: 1 MB

In 1990, Commodore UK sold a variant of the A2000, the A1500, for £999. The model designation was not officially sanctioned by Commodore International. The A1500 shipped with dual floppy drives, and 1 MB of ChipRAM as standard. Initial units came with Kickstart 1.3 (and thus AmigaOS 1.3), though the Original Chipset onboard includes a later Agnus revision allowing the 1MB of ChipRAM. Early machines were bundled with a Commodore 1084SD1 monitor. Later machines came with the ECS chipset and AmigaOS 2.04. The second floppy drive replaces the hard disk drive. The A1500 has no hard disk drive as standard and as the only significant difference the A1500s could be upgraded into A2000/HDs by addition of a hard disk controller (and associated drive).

There was also a replacement case kit for the Amiga 500 made by Checkmate Digital and also called A1500.

=== Amiga 2500 ===
Amiga 2500
- Type: Personal computer
- CPU: Motorola 68020 @ 14.3 MHz; Motorola 68030 @ 25 MHz
- Memory: 1 MB

The Amiga 2500, also known as the A2500, similar to the A1500 is not a distinct model, but simply a marketing name for an Amiga 2000 with a different base configuration. The configuration of an A2500 included a 14.3 MHz Motorola 68020 or 25 MHz 68030-based accelerator card. 68020 versions were referred to as A2500/20, and 68030 versions as A2500/30. The accelerator cards used by the A2500 (the A2620 and A2630) were also available separately as upgrades for the A2000. The A2620 included a Motorola 68881 FPU and Motorola 68851 MMU, whereas the A2630 included a Motorola 68882 FPU (and MMU built into the 68030).

Because the A2500 has a Motorola 68000 on the motherboard that goes unused, the design is not very cost-effective. A project to replace it with a 68020 on-board began, intending to be a Zorro-II-based 68020 machine, but the project eventually became the Amiga 3000 when Dave Haynie sought to include his new Zorro-III bus.

The A2500 remained in production after the release of the A3000, primarily because the original Video Toaster will not fit in an unmodified A3000 case. Until the release of the Video Toaster 4000, the A2500 was the fastest computer available for use with the Toaster.

A further variant called the A2500UX was also available which was supplied with Amiga Unix and a tape drive.

== Technical information ==
The majority of A2000 systems shipped with Commodore's Original Chip Set and 1 MB of RAM (512 KB of "chip" RAM and 512 KB additional RAM) and either AmigaOS 1.2 or 1.3. Later revisions shipped with the improved Enhanced Chip Set, 1 MB "chip" RAM and AmigaOS 2.0.

The A2000 shipped with a Motorola 68000 CPU, running at 7.16 MHz (NTSC) or 7.09 MHz (PAL). The CPU can be upgraded to a 68010 by direct replacement. Official and third-party expansion boards, which fit in the CPU expansion slot, feature 68020, 68030, 68040 or 68060 microprocessors. Such upgrades may also accommodate additional RAM, FPUs, MMUs and even SCSI controllers.

Memory capacity varies according to the hardware revision. Certain revisions of the A2000 can be upgraded to accommodate 1 MB of chip RAM by installing an 8372A Agnus chip. Likewise, 2 MB can be accommodated by fitting an 8372B Agnus chip and adding extra memory. There is a practical limit of 8 MB of additional RAM without the use of a CPU expansion card, due to the 68000's 24-bit address bus.

The A2000 brought a new capability to the Amiga line, the Zorro II bus. This expansion bus allows installation of compatible hardware through the AutoConfig standard, such as, graphic, sound, and network cards and Parallel ATA, SCSI and USB controllers.

The ISA slots can be activated by use of a bridgeboard, which connects the Zorro II and ISA buses. Such bridgeboards typically feature on-board IBM PC Compatible hardware, including Intel 80286, 80386 or 80486 microprocessors allowing emulation of an entire IBM-PC system in hardware. The remaining ISA slots can then be used with industry standard hardware of the era, such as, network cards, graphics cards and hard drive controllers. In some A2000 models, the two 8-bit ISA slots can also be upgraded to 16-bit by fitting extension edge connectors.

The video slot presents clocks, all 12-bits of digital video, Genlock signals, and some control lines for use to add-on cards. This allows use of dedicated genlocks, display deinterlacers, and video-switching and effects systems such as NewTek's Video Toaster.

=== Specifications ===
Attribute	Specification
Processor	Motorola 68000 at 7.16 MHz (NTSC) or 7.09 MHz (PAL)
RAM	1 MB consisting of either: 512 KB of "chip" RAM and 512 KB additional RAM^{[A]}^{[B]}; 1 MB of "chip" RAM^{[C]}; Upgradeable to 2 MB "chip" RAM (some models require hardware modification); Upgradeable by further 8 MB without CPU upgrade or up to 128 MB with CPU upgrade
ROM	256 or 512 KB Kickstart ROM
Chipset	Original Chip Set (OCS)^{[A]}^{[B]} or Enhanced Chip Set (ECS)^{[C]}
Video	12-bit color palette (4096 colors) Graphic modes with up to 32, 64 (EHB mode) or 4096 (HAM mode) on-screen colors: 320×200 to 320×400i (NTSC); 320×256 to 320×512i (PAL); Graphic modes with up to 16 on-screen colors: 640×200 to 640×400i (NTSC); 640×256 to 640×512i (PAL); ECS only graphic modes: 1280×200 to 1280×512i and 640×480p60 (VGA) with up to 4 on-screen colors; 800×600i60 (Super72) with 2 on-screen colors
Audio	4× 8-bit PCM channels (2 stereo channels) 28 kHz maximum DMA sampling rate (56 kHz in ECS-only modes); 70 dB S/N ratio
Internal storage	3.5" SCSI hard disk drive (A2000HD only)
Removable storage	3.5" DD floppy disk drive (880 KB capacity)
Audio/video ports	Analog RGB video out (DB-23M) Monochrome composite video out (RCA)^{[B]}^{[C]} Audio out (2× RCA); Genlock slot (internal)^{[A]} Video slot (internal)^{[B]}^{[C]}
Input/output ports	Keyboard port (5 pin DIN) 2× Mouse/Gamepad ports (DE9); RS-232 serial port (DB-25M); Centronics style parallel port (DB-25F); Floppy disk drive port (DB-23F)
Expansion slots	5× 100-pin 16-bit Zorro II slots (AutoConfig) 2× 16-bit ISA slots (requires bridgeboard to activate); 2× 8-bit ISA slots (requires bridgeboard to activate); 1× 86-pin CPU/MMU expansion slot
Operating system	AmigaOS 1.2/1.3 (Kickstart 1.2/1.3 and Workbench 1.2/1.3) or AmigaOS 2.0 (Kickstart 2.04 and Workbench 2.04)^{[C]}
Other	2× front accessible 3.5" drive bays 1× front accessible 5.25" drive bay Battery-backed real-time clock

==== Notes ====
1. Model A (revision 3.0-4.0), 1986
2. Model B (revision 4.1-5.0), 1986
3. Model C (revision 6.0-6.5), 1991

== See also ==
- List of Amiga models and variants
