= Amiga video connector =

- Type: Analogue video connector

Production history
- Designed: 1980s

General specifications
- Video signal: Analogue RGB and Digital Red-Green-Blue-Intensity
- Pins: 23

Pinout
- Male connector seen from the front
Pin 1		XCLK External Clock
Pin 2		XCLKEN External Clock Enable
Pin 3		RED Analog Red
Pin 4		GREEN Analog Green
Pin 5		BLUE Analog Blue
Pin 6		DI Digital Intensity (47 Ohm)
Pin 7		DB Digital Blue (47 Ohm)
Pin 8		DG Digital Green (47 Ohm)
Pin 9		DR Digital Red (47 Ohm)
Pin 10		CSYNC Composite Sync (used for all monitor cables)
Pin 11		HSYNC Horizontal Sync (47 Ohm)
Pin 12		VSYNC Vertical Sync (47 Ohm)
Pin 13		GNDRTN Return for XCLKEN (don't connect to GND)
Pin 14		ZD Zero Detect (47 Ohm)
Pin 15		C1 Clock Out
Pin 16		GND red
Pin 17		GND green
Pin 18		GND blue
Pin 19		GND HVsync
Pin 20		GND video
Pin 21		-12 Volt DC (50 mA) / -5V
Pin 22		+12 Volt DC (100 mA)
Pin 23		+5 Volt DC (100 mA)

The Amiga video connector is a 23-pin male D-subminiature connector fitted to all personal computers in the Amiga range produced by Commodore International from 1985 to 1994, and by Escom from 1995 to 1996. The connector carries signals for analogue and digital RGB, RGB intensity, and genlocking as well as power.

Default Amiga screen modes are directly compatible with TVs in the region in which the computer was sold, so that the user could connect the computer to a common TV if no monitor was available. In the PAL region, the Amiga could be connected directly to the standardized SCART RGB connector on the TV via an adapter cable sold by Commodore, providing superior image quality.

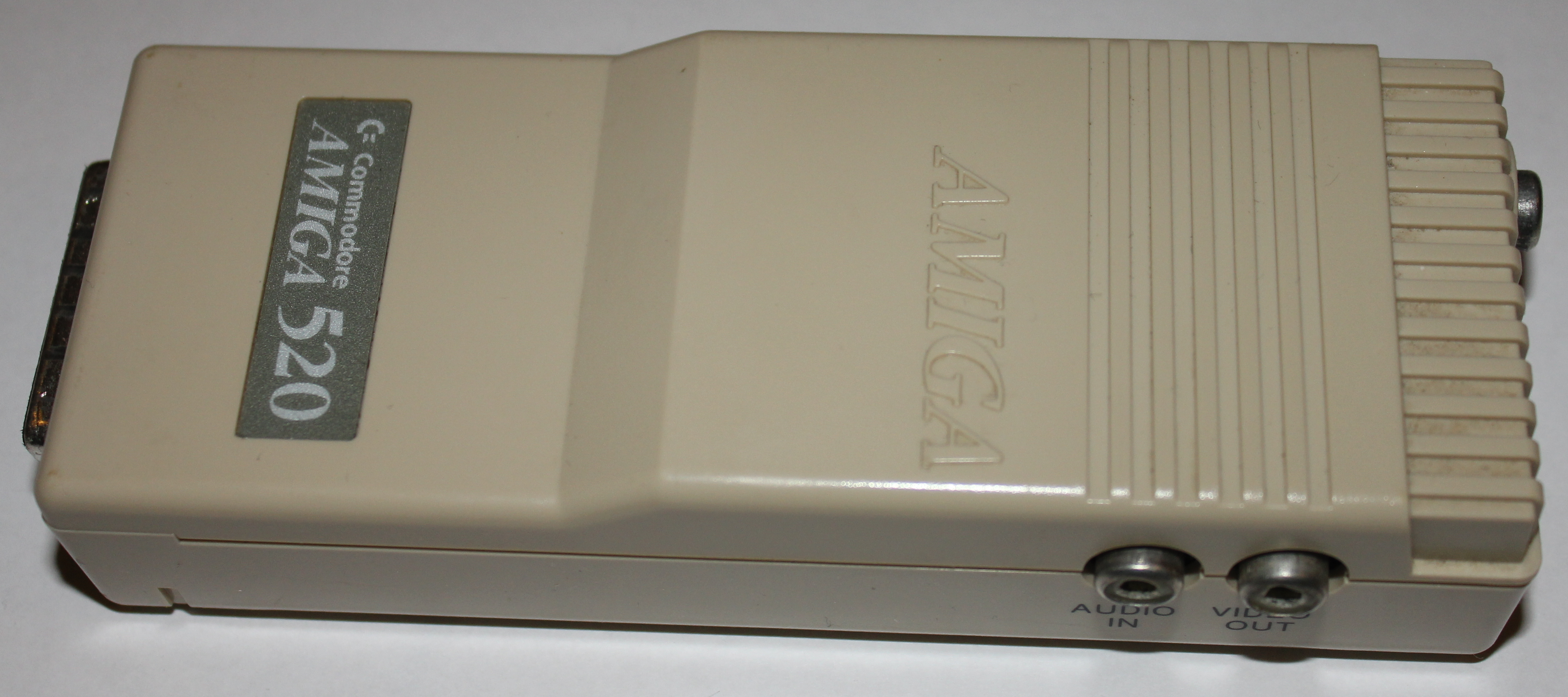
The Amiga 520 adapter allowed for RF modulated and composite video output, to be connected to a TV

Alternatively, Commodore sold an adapter (the A520), that attached to the Amiga video connector and provided composite and RF outputs appropriate to the region in which it was sold.

Commodore also sold a range of monitors, which were compatible with the TV signals of the region in which they were sold, and in the PAL region many even had SCART inputs so that not only Amigas, but also other SCART-compatible equipment (such as VCRs) could be attached to them.

While most first and second generation Amigas (with the original and the enhanced graphics chipsets) only could output TV compatible screen modes (15 kHz horizontal scan rate), the Amiga 3000 also featured a connector for VGA type monitors, providing deinterlaced or scan-doubled 31 kHz scan rate.

The third generation of Amiga computers (with the Advanced Graphics Array chipset) could output a wide range of resolutions and scan rates, and Commodore introduced a line of multisync monitors to accommodate this. These computers could also output directly to the VGA monitors that by then had become commonplace, provided they were configured to output in a VGA compatible resolution and refresh rate. To enable this, Commodore sold an adapter which, like the A520, attached to the video connector to provide a standard VGA connector.

== See also ==
- Amiga
- List of video connectors
