= Amiga 4000 =

1992 personal computer

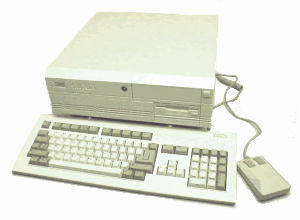
- An Amiga 4000 desktop
- Manufacturer: Commodore
- Type: Personal computer
- Released: 21 October 1992; 33 years ago
- Discontinued: 1994
- Units sold: 11,300 units in Germany
- Operating system: AmigaOS 3.0
- CPU: Motorola 68EC030 or 68040 @ 25 MHz
- Memory: 2-18 MB
- Predecessor: Amiga 3000
- Successor: Amiga 4000T

The Amiga 4000, or A4000, from Commodore is the successor of the Amiga 2000 and Amiga 3000 computers. There are two models: the A4000/040 released in October 1992 with a Motorola 68040 CPU, and the A4000/030 released in April 1993 with a Motorola 68EC030.

The Amiga 4000 system design was generally similar to that of the A3000, but introduced the Advanced Graphics Architecture (AGA) chipset with enhanced graphics. The SCSI system from previous Amigas was replaced by the lower-cost Parallel ATA.

The original A4000 is housed in a beige horizontal desktop box with a separate keyboard. Later, Commodore released an expanded tower version called the A4000T.

The machine is reported to have sold 11,300 units in Germany.

== Technical information ==
=== Processor and RAM ===
The stock A4000 shipped with either a Motorola 68EC030 or 68040 CPU, 2 MB of Amiga Chip RAM and up to 16 MB of additional RAM in 32-bit SIMMs. There is a non-functional jumper that was intended to expand the "chip RAM" to 8MB. Later, third-party developers created various CPU expansion boards featuring higher-rated 68040, 68060 and PowerPC CPUs. Such hardware also typically offers faster and higher-capacity RAM (128 MB or greater).

=== A4000-CR version ===
Unlike previous Amiga models, early A4000 machines have the CPU mounted in an expansion board; the motherboard does not have an integrated CPU. Later revisions of the A4000 have the CPU and 2 MB RAM surface-mounted on the motherboard in an effort to reduce costs. These machines are known as the A4000-CR (cost-reduced) and the surface-mounted CPU is a 68EC030. The cost-reduced models also make use of a non-rechargeable lithium battery for real-time clock battery backup rather than a rechargeable NiCad battery. The NiCad backup battery is one of the most common causes of problems in an aging device that uses one because it has a tendency to eventually leak. The released fluids are somewhat corrosive and can eventually damage the circuitry.

=== Graphics and sound ===
The A4000 is the first Amiga model to have shipped with Commodore's third-generation Amiga chipset, the 32-bit Advanced Graphics Architecture (AGA). As the name implies, AGA introduces improved graphical abilities, specifically, a palette expanded from 12-bit color depth (4,096 colors) to 24-bit (16.8 million colors) and new 64, 128, 256 and 262,144 (HAM-8) color modes. Unlike earlier Amiga chipsets, all color modes are available at all display resolutions. AGA also improves sprite capacity and graphics performance. The on-board sound hardware remains identical to that of the original Amiga chipset (the Paula sound chip), namely, four DMA-driven 8-bit PCM channels, with two channels for the left speaker and two for the right.

=== Peripherals and expansion ===
The A4000 has a number of Amiga-specific connectors, including two DE-9 ports for joysticks, mice, and light pens, a standard 25-pin RS-232 serial port and a 25-pin Centronics parallel port. As a result, at launch the A4000 was compatible with many existing Amiga peripherals, such as MIDI devices, serial modems and sound samplers.

Like the just-earlier Amiga model, the 3000, the A4000 has four internal 32-bit Zorro III expansion slots. This expansion bus allows the use of devices which comply with the AutoConfig standard, such as graphic cards, audio cards, network cards, SCSI controllers, and later even USB controllers. One of the most notable hardware items of the era is the NewTek Video Toaster system which became popular in the 1990s for amateur and commercial desktop video production of standard-definition broadcast quality video, consisting of tools for video switching, chroma keying, character generation, animation, and image manipulation.

The three ISA slots can be activated by use of a bridgeboard, which connects the Zorro and ISA buses. Such bridgeboards typically feature on-board IBM-PC-compatible hardware, including Intel 80286, 80386, or 80486 microprocessors allowing emulation of an entire IBM-PC system in hardware. Compatible ISA cards may then be installed into the two remaining ISA slots.

Later, in an effort to offer modern expansion options third-party developers created replacement expansion boards for the A4000 which provide PCI slots allowing use of higher performance and widely available PCI hardware, such as graphic, sound, and network cards.

=== Operating system ===
The A4000 shipped with AmigaOS 3.0, consisting of Workbench 3.0 and Kickstart 3.0, which together provide a single-user multi-tasking operating system and support for the built-in hardware. Following release of AmigaOS 3.1 it became possible to upgrade the A4000 by installing compatible Kickstart 3.1 ROM chips. The later AmigaOS 3.5 and 3.9 releases were software-only updates requiring Kickstart 3.1.

AmigaOS 4, a PowerPC-native release of the operating system, can be used with the A4000 provided a CyberStorm PPC board is installed. Likewise, MorphOS, an alternative Amiga-compatible operating system, can be used with this hardware.

Variants of platform-independent operating systems, such as Linux and BSD, can also be used with the A4000.

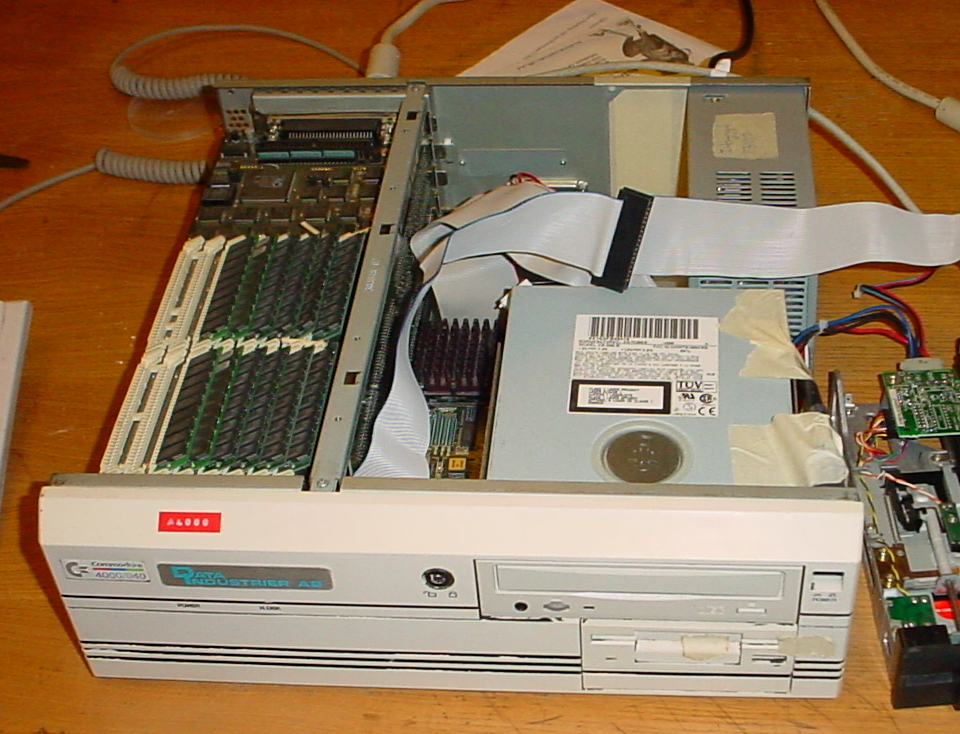
Amiga 4000 with case open

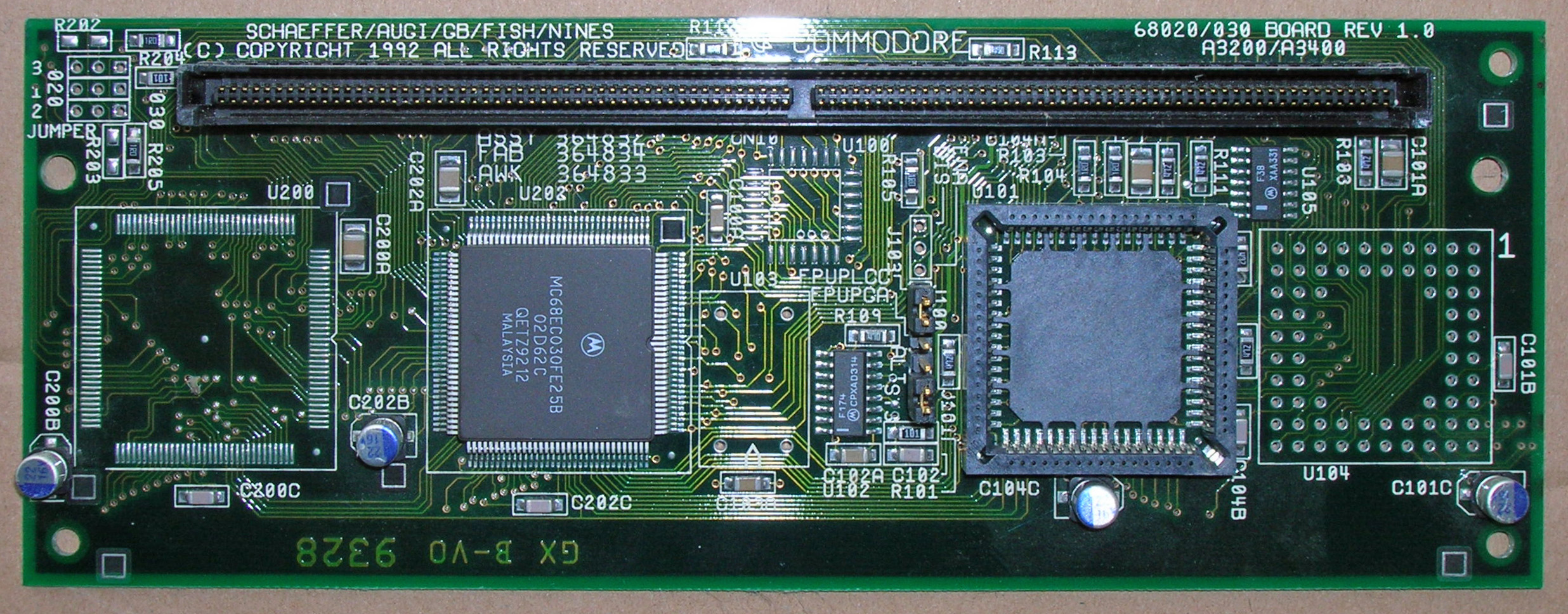
Amiga A3200/A3400 CPU card

=== Specifications ===
Attribute	Specification
Processor	Motorola 68EC030 or 68040 at 25 MHz
Bus speed	25 MHz
RAM	2–18 MB on board (2 MB "chip" RAM and up to 16 MB additional RAM); Upgradable by further 128 MB via the CPU slot and 512 MB per Zorro III slot
ROM	512 kB Kickstart ROM
Chipset	Advanced Graphics Architecture (AGA)
Video	24-bit color palette (16.8 Million colors); Up to 256 on-screen colors in indexed mode 262,144 on-screen colors in HAM-8 mode Resolutions from: 320×200 to 1280×400i (NTSC); 320×256 to 1280×512i (PAL); 640×480 (VGA), 800×600i, 1024×768i, 1280×720i, 1280×1024i; Horizontal scan rates of 15.60-31.44 kHz; Vertical scan rates of 50–72 Hz
Audio	4 × 8-bit PCM channels (2 stereo channels) 28–56 kHz maximum DMA sampling rate (dependent on video mode in use)
Internal storage	120 MB 3.5" IDE hard disk drive (upgradable)
Removable storage	3.5" HD floppy disk drive (1.76 MB capacity)
Input/output ports	Analog RGB video out (DB-23M); Audio out (2 × RCA); Keyboard (6 pin mini-DIN); 2 × Mouse/Gamepad ports (DE9); RS-232 serial port (DB-25M); Centronics style parallel port (DB-25F); Floppy disk drive port (DB-23F); Internal buffered ATA controller (40-pin)
Expansion slots	4 × 100pin 32-bit Zorro III slots 1 × AGA video slot (inline with Zorro slot); 3 × 16-bit ISA slots (requires bridgeboard to activate); 1 × 200-pin CPU expansion slot 4 or 5 × 72-pin SIMM slots
Operating system	AmigaOS 3.0 (Kickstart 3.0/Workbench 3.0)
Physical dimensions	W × H × D: 15 × 5 × 15 1/4" (380 × 125 × 395 mm)
Other	2 × front-accessible 3.5" drive bays 1 × front-accessible 5.25" drive bay 2 × internal 3.5" drive mountings Key lock (disables mouse and keyboard)

== Notable uses ==
Digital Domain used an Amiga 4000 for motion control effects in films such as True Lies, Apollo 13, and Titanic.

== See also ==
- List of Amiga models and variants
