= List of Amiga models and variants =

This is a list of models and clones of Amiga computers.

== Development ==
The first Amiga computer was the "Lorraine" by Amiga Corporation in 1984, developed using the Sage IV system. It consisted of a stack of breadboarded circuit boards. Commodore International purchased the company and the prototype and released the first model, Amiga 1000 in 1985.

== Production timeline ==
Amiga Production Timeline
	1985		1986				1987				1988				1989				1990				1991				1992				1993				1994				1995				1996				1997				1998	
	3	4	1	2	3	4	1	2	3	4	1	2	3	4	1	2	3	4	1	2	3	4	1	2	3	4	1	2	3	4	1	2	3	4	1	2	3	4	1	2	3	4	1	2	3	4	1	2	3	4	1	2
Brand Owner	Commodore International																																				Escom								QuikPak							
Chipsets	OCS																																																			
Chipsets																					ECS																															
Chipsets																														AGA																						
Desktop	A1000							A1500/A2000/A2500																																												
Desktop																					A3000/A3000T/A3000UX									A4000/A4000T																						
Low End										A500																A500+				A1200																						
Low End																												A600																								
Game Console																								CDTV										CD32																		

== Commodore Amiga models ==
=== Original Chipset (OCS) ===
Model	Timescale	CPU type	RAM (base)	Bundled OS version	OS version supported	Additional information
Amiga 1000	1985–1987	68000	256 KB	1.0 – 1.1	3.1 / 3.9 (Note: Due to the requirements of 3.9 it is difficult to do so.) / 3.2 (Note: There are various Amiga OS branches based on the OS 3.1 sources: 3.5/3.9 by Haage & Partner, 4.x by Hyperion Entertainment and 3.1.x/3.2 also by Hyperion Entertainment (and in part based on the OS 4.x branch sources.))	Later A1000s shipped with 512 KB base memory
Amiga 2000 A-model	1987	68000	1 MB	1.2	3.9 / 3.2	First desktop Amiga with internal expansion slots (Zorro II) used the Amiga 1000 chipset 512 KB Chip RAM, 512 KB Fast RAM on CPU slot card
Amiga 500	1987–1991	68000	512 KB	1.2 – 1.3	3.1 / 3.2	First "low-end" Amiga; later A500s shipped with 1 MB memory
Amiga 2000	1987–1992	68000	1 MB	1.2 – 2.04	3.9 / 3.2	revised expandable model with Amiga 500 chipset Hard-drive equipped versions were labeled "A2000HD"
Amiga 2500	1989–1990	68020, 68030	1 MB	1.3	3.9 / 3.2	A2000+68020/68030 card (not a distinct model); Hard-drive equipped versions were labeled "A2500HD"
Amiga 1500	1990–1991	68000	1 MB	1.3	3.9 / 3.2	UK only, variant of A2000 with two floppy drives and no HDD. This version originated with CBM UK Marketing who found it necessary to distinguish the floppy-only version from the A2000 with the general public.
Amiga CDTV	1991–1992	68000	1 MB	1.3	3.1 / 3.2	CD-ROM-based multimedia machine

=== Enhanced Chipset (ECS) ===
Model	Timescale	CPU type	RAM (base)	Bundled OS version	OS version supported	Additional information
Amiga 3000	1990–1992	68030	1 MB Chip; 1-4 MB Fast	1.3 – 2.04	3.9 / 4.1 FE (Note: Version 4.0 and higher requires a PowerPC accelerator, such as the PowerUP series of accelerator boards.) / 3.2	First Zorro III system. Initial machines had a 1.4 beta ROM that looked for a "super" Kickstart disk similar to the 1000. It could load Kickstart versions 1.3, 2.0, and 2.04 this way or from specially named partitions on the hard disk. Developers could also "kick" in higher versions of the OS, up to 3.1
Amiga 3000T	1991–1992	68030, 68040	1-2 MB Chip; 1-4 MB Fast	2.04	3.9 / 4.1 FE / 3.2	First "towerized" Amiga
Amiga 3000UX	1990–199?	68030	2 MB Chip; 4 MB Fast	1.3 – 2.04	3.9 / 4.1 FE / 3.2	UNIX-based Amiga 3000
Amiga 500+	1991–1992	68000	1 MB	2.04	3.1 / 3.2	ECS-based A500 with 1 MB RAM base memory
Amiga 600	1992	68000	1 MB	2.05	3.9 / 3.2	First Amiga using SMT, built-in IDE and PCMCIA support. There was also an A600HD version that had a built-in hard disk.

=== Advanced Graphics Architecture (AGA) ===
Model	Timescale	CPU type	RAM (base)	Bundled OS version	OS version supported	Additional information
Amiga 4000	1992–1994	68EC030, 68040	2 MB Chip; 2–4 MB Fast	3.0	3.9 / 4.1 FE / 3.2	First AGA machine
Amiga 1200	1992–1996	68EC020	2 MB	3.0 – 3.1	3.9 / 4.1 FE / 3.2	Entry-level AGA machine. Standard IDE controller and space for a 2.5" hard drive. A1200HD shipped with 20–209MB hard drives
Amiga CD32	1993–1994	68EC020	2 MB	3.1	3.9 / 3.2	32-bit CD-ROM-based console
Amiga 4000T	1994–1996	68040, 68060	2 MB Chip; 4 MB Fast	3.1	3.9 / 4.1 FE / 3.2	Towerized version of the A4000

== PowerPC-based AmigaOS models (post Commodore) ==
These models are not hardware compatible with the 68k Amigas.

Various chipsets (PPC)
Model (motherboard)	Timescale	CPU type	RAM (base)	OS version	Additional information
AmigaOne SE (Teron CX)	2002–2004	PowerPC G3	Varies	4.0 – 4.1 FE	ATX format motherboard
AmigaOne XE (Teron PX)	2003–2004	PowerPC G3 or G4	Varies	4.0 – 4.1 FE	ATX format motherboard
MicroA1 – "C" and "I" (Teron Mini)	2004–2005	PowerPC G3	256 MB	4.0 – 4.1 FE	Mini-ITX format motherboard
AmigaOne 500	2011–present	AMCC 460ex SoC	2 GB	4.1 – 4.1 FE	Complete system
AmigaOne X1000	2012–2015	PWRficient PA6T	2 or 4+ GB	4.1.5 – 4.1 FE	Complete system
AmigaOne X5000	2016–present	P5020	2 or 4+ GB	4.1 FE	Complete system

== Video chipsets ==
Chipset	Introduction year	Resolution non-interlaced
Original Chip Set (OCS)	1985	640 × 256 @ 4-bpp (PAL)
Enhanced Chip Set (ECS)	1990	640 × 480 @ 2-bpp
Advanced Graphics Architecture (AGA)	1992	640 × 480 @ 8-bpp

=== Unproduced chipsets ===
These chipsets were planned but never fabricated.

Chipset	Planned introduction year	Resolution non-interlaced	Comment
AAA chipset	1992	1280 × 1024 @ 16-bpp	three "Nyx" technology demonstrators built
Amiga Ranger Chipset	1988	1024 × 1024 @ 7-bpp	scratched in favor of ECS
AA+ Chipset	1994	800 × 600 @ 8-bpp	improved AGA intended as low-end alternative to AAA
Hombre chipset	1995	1280 × 1024 @ 32-bpp	integrating PA-RISC, never completed

== Other AmigaOS compatible computers ==
Some computers were released by other companies which were AmigaOS compatible.

- DraCo: Released by MacroSystem in 1994. This was a high end machine which ran AmigaOS 3.1, but did not include the Amiga chipset, instead using a graphics card. A second version was known as the Draco Vision. A newer model, the Draco Casablanca, was released in 1997. The machines featured a 68040 or 68060 CPU.
- The Access: Released by Index Information in 1998. This was an Amiga compatible similar to the A1200, but on a motherboard which could fit into a standard 5 1/4" drive bay. It featured either a 68020 or 68030 CPU, with a redesigned AGA chipset, and ran AmigaOS 3.1.
- Minimig is a hardware compatible open source re-implementation of an Amiga 500 using a field-programmable gate array (FPGA).
- Vampire V4 Standalone, released by Apollo Team in 2019, provides ECS/AGA chipset re-implementation, plus "68080" CPU and "Super AGA" graphics, also using a field-programmable gate array (FPGA).
- The Pegasos II and Sam440ep can run AmigaOS 4.

== Unreleased models ==
Prototypes:

- A3500: Prototype of the Amiga 3000T, it was housed in a Commodore PC60-III tower case.

Due to management turmoil, some viable Amiga models under development were cancelled prior to release:

- A3000+: Prototyped in 1991, it used the AGA chipset and had an AT&T DSP3210 chip, high-fidelity audio, telephone line interface, and 2.5 Mbit/s RS-485 network port.
- A1000+: Intermediate in price and features between the A1200 and A3000+, it would have been a detached keyboard system with expansion slots (two Zorro slots, video slot, CPU slot).

== Unreleased models (after Commodore) ==
A number of new Amiga models were announced after the end of the Commodore model era. However, very few of them were ever produced beyond simple prototypes (if they even got that far). Some of these were announced by companies who later owned, or sought to own, the Amiga rights. Others were unofficial machines which would run AmigaOS, whilst others still were intended to run an operating system compatible with Amiga software. Some models that were never produced include:

- The Amiga Walker: Announced early 1996 by Amiga Technologies, this was supposed to be a new, compact Amiga computer. Its case design, quite unlike those of past Amiga models, comprised a metallic grey shell about the size of a games console, with a distinctive curved rear. Jokes were made comparing the shape to that of a vacuum cleaner. There were two more-or-less working prototypes of the Walker and it was never released into the mass market.
- The A\box, pre\box and AMIRAGE K2: These were PowerPC-based machines announced by the German company Phase5. The A\box, announced in 1996, was to feature a new custom graphics chipset named Caipirinha, and a new Amiga-compatible operating system. This was replaced in 1998 by the announcement of the pre\box, which was to feature four PowerPC processors, and was to run AmigaOS 3.1. Finally, in 1999 the AMIRAGE K2 was announced, based on the QNX operating system.
- The Amiga 40x0L models: QuikPak announced a range of machines while they were planning to purchase rights to the Amiga during late 1996 and early 1997. These were models with a 68030, 68040 or 68060 processor, and included portable "luggable" versions. Some models were planned to be fitted with NewTek's Video Toaster Flyer. QuikPak were a manufacturer for the Amiga 4000T.
- The A5000 and A6000: These were new models announced by Power Computing in 1997. They originally featured a 68030 or 68040 for the A5000, and a 68060 for the A6000.
- The BoXeR: Designed by Mick Tinker at Access Innovations, and announced in 1997, the BoXeR was to be a new motherboard based on a Motorola 68040 or 68060 processor. Amongst other improvements over the Commodore motherboards of the time, it incorporated the aging AGA chipset into one chip. It never got far beyond the advanced prototyping stage. Tinker was also responsible for the Access, which was basically an Amiga 1200 that was re-jigged to fit into a full length 5.25" drive bay.
- The Amiga Multimedia Convergence Computer: Announced by Gateway in 1999. This was to feature a new operating system known as the Amiga Operating Environment (Amiga OE) based on QNX, which had been chosen in preference to Linux, BeOS, Epoc32, and VxWorks. However, alongside QNX Software Systems own announcement of the QNX Developer Network for Amigans, Amiga Inc.'s issued its own announcement indicating that the company would instead be choosing Linux as the kernel for the Amiga OE.

== See also ==
- Amiga Sidecar
