= Amiga 4000T =

Tower unit personal computer

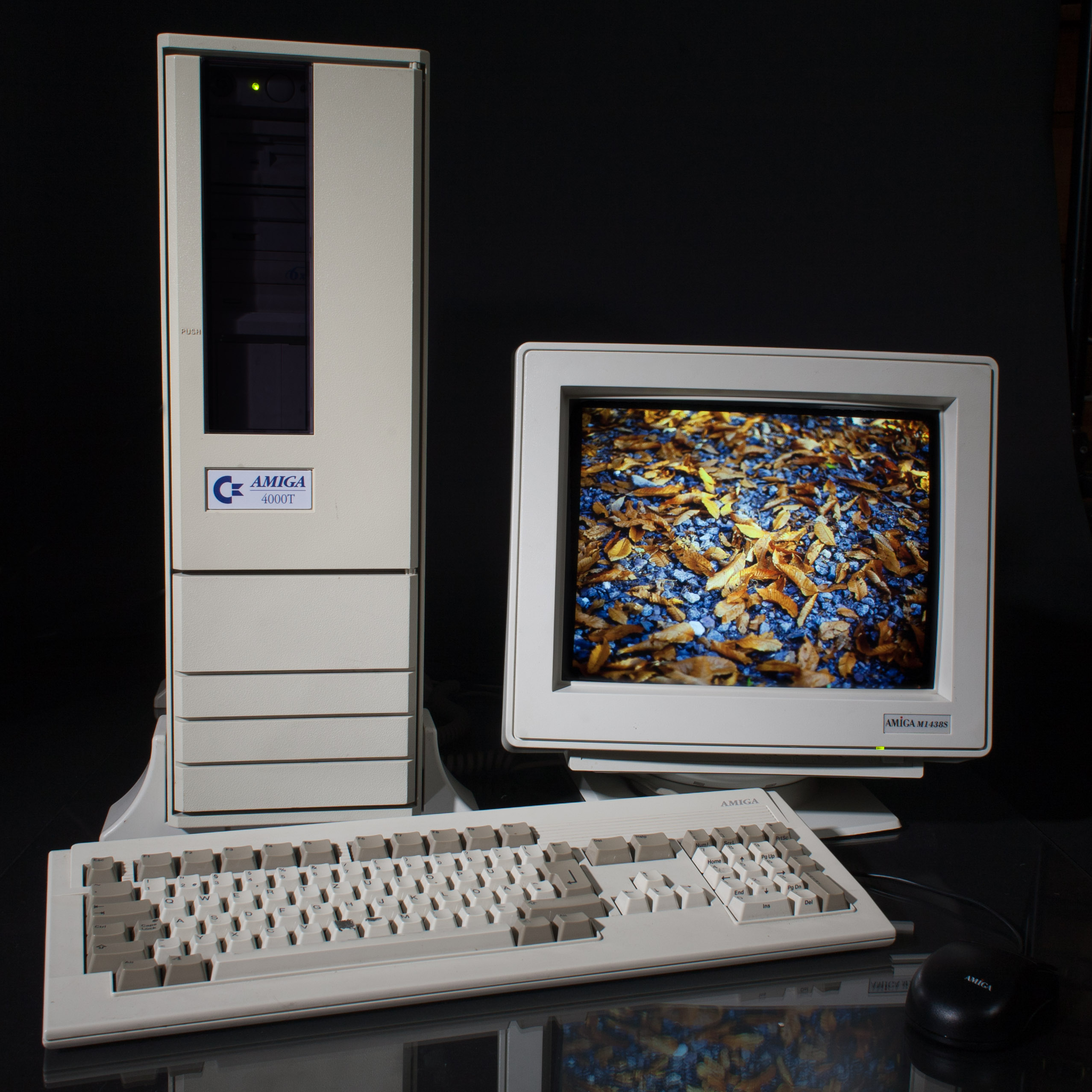
- Manufacturer: Commodore, Amiga Technologies GmbH
- Type: Personal computer
- Released: 1994; 32 years ago
- Discontinued: 1998
- Operating system: AmigaOS 3.1
- CPU: Motorola 68040 @ 25 MHz or 68060 @ 50 MHz
- Memory: 6 - 18 MB
- Removable storage: floppy disk
- Graphics: Advanced Graphics Architecture
- Sound: 4 channels, 8-bit resolution, 6-bit volume, stereo
- Related: Amiga 4000

The Amiga 4000T, also known as A4000T, is a tower version of Commodore's A4000 personal computer. Using the AGA chipset, it was originally released in small quantities in 1994 with a 25 MHz Motorola 68040 CPU, and re-released in greater numbers by Escom in 1995, after Commodore's demise, along with a new variant that featured a 50 MHz Motorola 68060 CPU. Despite the subsequent demise of Escom, production was continued by QuikPak in North America into at least 1998.

== Technical details ==
The A4000T was the only Amiga ever to have both SCSI and IDE interfaces built-in on the motherboard. Having driver software for both interfaces in the 512 KB ROM meant that some other parts of AmigaOS had to be moved from the ROM, and thus the A4000T was the only machine to require the file workbench.library to be stored on disk (this has changed, though, with the introduction of AmigaOS 3.2 and Kickstart 3.2, which too require workbench.library (and icon.library) to be stored on disk). It was also the only Amiga to use a PC form factor for the motherboard (AT), and one of the few to use a lithium battery instead of a nickel–cadmium rechargeable battery, vastly reducing the risk of leaking corrosive fluids onto the motherboard and causing damage with age. Modularity was another unique aspect to the machine, with the CPU, audio, video, and input-output ports all on separate daughterboards. This made the machine near-modular.

The machine was targeted as a high-end video workstation with expandability in mind and an eye towards NewTek's Video Toaster. Its motherboard, the latest revision of which was manufactured in yellow and green versions, contains two Amiga Video Slots, five 100-pin Zorro III slots, and 4 ISA slots, and its case can accommodate up to six drives. Up to 16 MB of RAM can be installed on the motherboard, while additional RAM can be installed on some CPU boards (up to 128 MB), and yet more can be added on Zorro cards. For CPU upgrades, a 200-pin KEL socket is used.

== Legacy and the end of "classic" Amiga line ==
This was the last computer to be released by Commodore International. It is estimated that only 200 Commodore-branded A4000Ts were produced before the company folded. Production of the A4000T was restarted after Escom bought the Amiga assets, and QuikPak assisted Escom in the assembly of A4000T motherboards for the European market, and entire towers for the North American market. Apart from the new option of a 68060 CPU, the Escom-manufactured 4000Ts had minor differences from the old one including the substitution of the high density floppy drive with a double density one, and a different front bezel on the case. The case itself was a re-purposed PC case, which is evidenced by the presence of the Turbo button whose function in A4000T was to disable the internal speaker (as Amigas don't support the PC-specific speed reduction that was the button's original function). Amidst major distributors like SMG exiting the Amiga market, Escom's bankruptcy in 1996, and further Amiga asset ownership changes, QuikPak continued to offer customized A4000T workstations equipped with and 68060 accelerators, and even showcased the tower Amigas during 1996 Summer Olympic Games in Atlanta. Ultimately, however, Amiga 4000T and Amiga 1200 whose production was also continued by Escom, were the last Amigas of what has been later referred to as the "classic" Amiga line.

A4000T motherboards were also sold separately for OEM use, an interesting example being HDI-1000, an ultrasound machine made by ACL (a company later acquired by Philips) that in addition to the A4000T motherboard used a custom-built 68060 accelerator, and custom software based on AmigaOS.

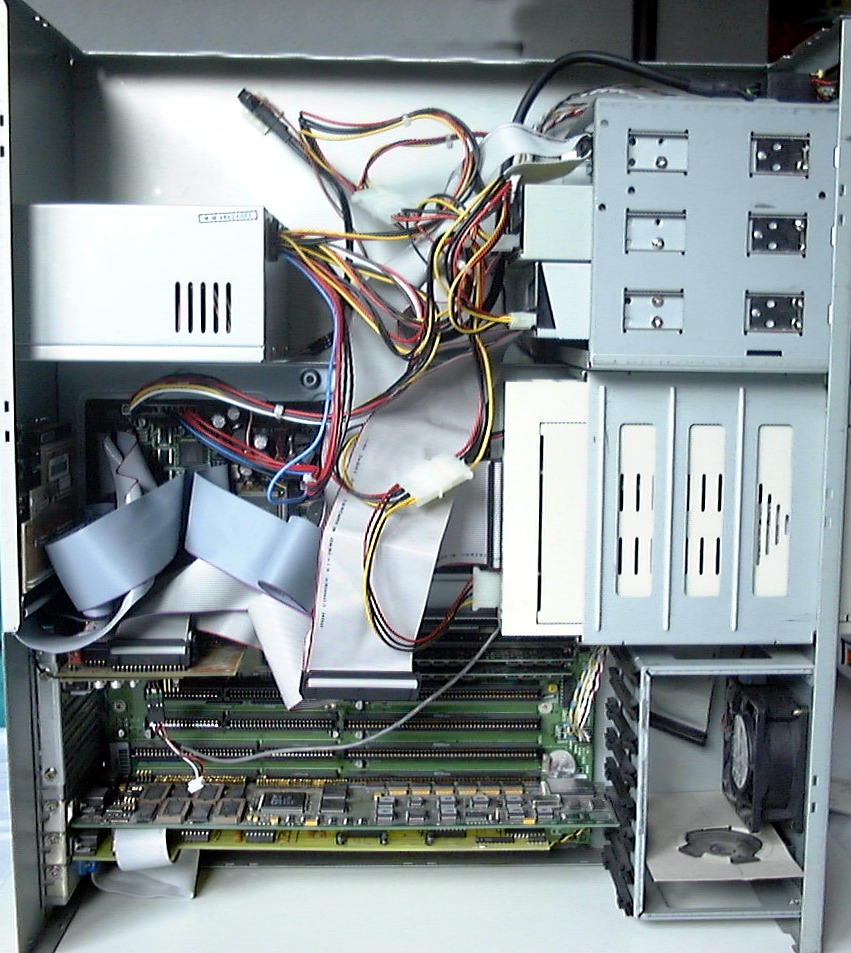
Amiga 4000T internals

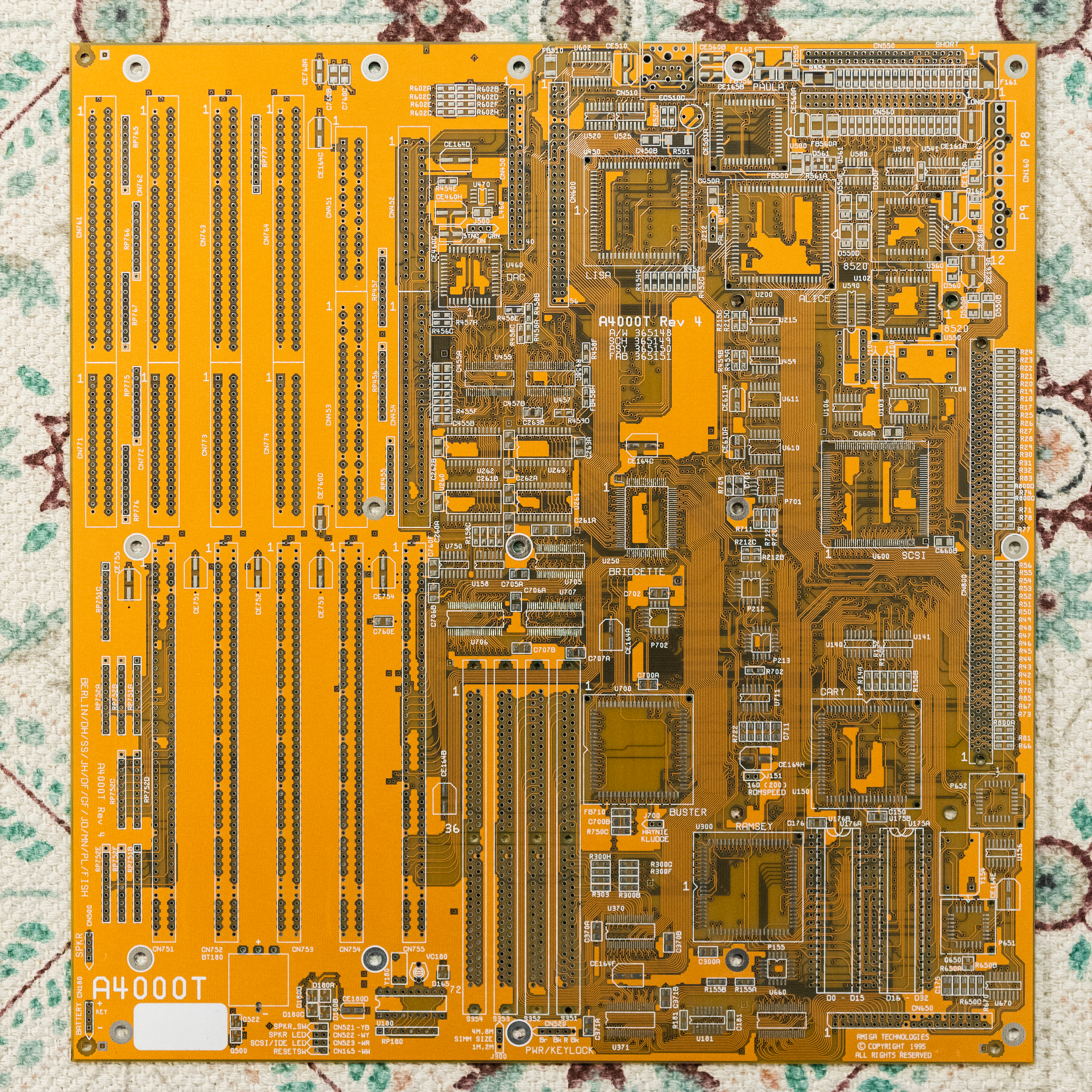
Yellow version of the Amiga 4000T motherboard PCB

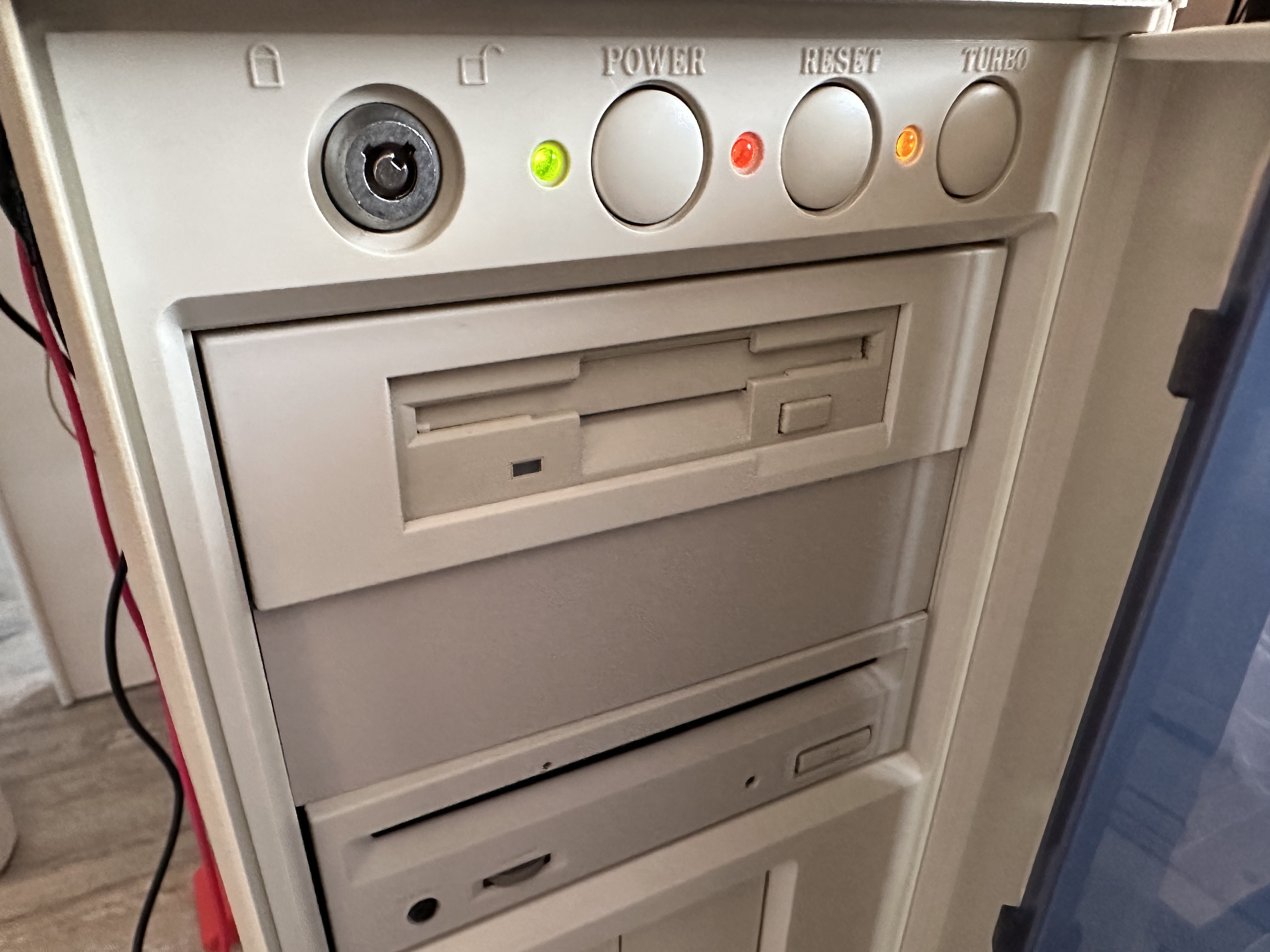
Turbo button on front panel that in A4000T is used to disable the internal speaker

== Specifications ==
- CPU:
  - 68040 at 25 MHz (1994)
  - 68060 at 50 MHz (1996)
- Memory:
  - 512 kB Kickstart ROM
  - 2 MB Amiga Chip RAM
  - Up to a further 16 MB RAM on board
  - Up to an additional 128 MB RAM via the CPU slot on the CPU's local bus
  - Up to an additional 512 MB per Zorro III slot
- Chipset: AGA (Advanced Graphics Architecture)
  - Video:
    - 24-bit color palette (16.8 Million colors)
    - Up to 256 on-screen colors in indexed mode
    - 262,144 on-screen colors in HAM-8 mode
    - Resolutions of up to 1280×512i (more with overscan)
    - HSync rates of 15.60-31.44 kHz
  - Audio (Paula):
    - 4 hardware channels (Stereo)
    - 8-bit resolution / 6-bit volume
    - Maximum DMA sampling rate of 28-56 kHz (depending on video mode in use)
- Removable Storage:
  - 3.5" HD floppy disk drive, capacity 1.76 MB
- Internal storage:
  - 34-pin floppy connector
  - 40-pin buffered ATA-Controller
  - 50-pin fast SCSI-2
- Input/Output connections:
  - Analog RGB video out (DB-23M)
  - Audio out (2 × RCA)
  - Audio out (1 × 3.5mm headphone jack)
  - Keyboard (5 pin DIN)
  - 2 × Mouse/Gamepad ports (DE9)
  - RS-232 serial port (DB-25M)
  - Centronics style parallel port (DB-25F)
  - Fast SCSI-2 (D-High density DB-50F)
- Expansion Slots:
  - 5 × 100-pin 32-bit Zorro III slots
  - 2 × AGA video slots (inline with Zorro slot)
  - 4 × 16-bit ISA slots (require bridgeboard to activate)
  - 1 × 200-pin CPU expansion slot
  - 4 × 72-pin SIMMs slots
- Operating System:
  - AmigaOS 3.1 (Kickstart 3.1/Workbench 3.1)
- Other Characteristics:
  - 0 × front accessible 3.5" drive bays
  - 5 × front accessible 5.25" drive bay
  - 1 × internal 5.25" drive mountings
  - Key lock (disables mouse and keyboard)

== See also ==
- List of Amiga models and variants
