= EHB =

EHB may refer to:

- Extraordinary Human Being, in the town of Nafplio in Greece
- Erasmushogeschool Brussel, a university in Belgium
- Essential health benefits in the United States
- Extra Half-Brite, a screen mode of the Amiga micro computer
- The Kingdom of Ehb in the computer game Dungeon Siege
- European Hydrogen Backbone
