= Flicker fixer =

Video de-interlacer

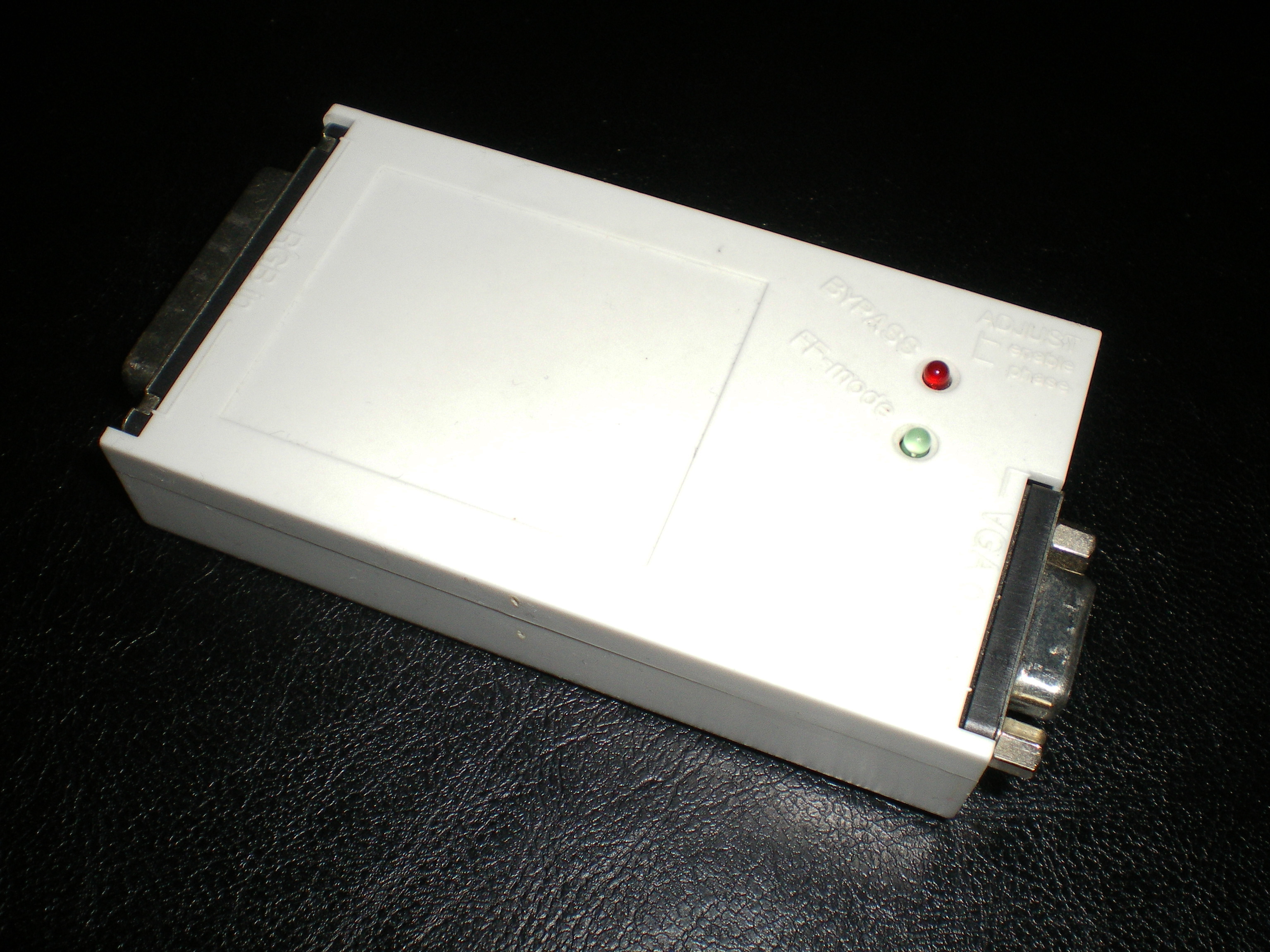
External flicker fixer

A flicker fixer or scan doubler is a piece of computer hardware that de-interlaces an output video signal. The flicker fixer accomplishes this by adjusting the timing of the natively interlaced video signal to suit the needs of a progressive display for example a CRT computer monitor. Flicker fixers in essence create a progressive frame of video from two interlaced fields of video.

Flicker fixers sample the NTSC/PAL output from the output device and store each scan line from the field currently being displayed in RAM while simultaneously outputting the line alternately with the corresponding neighboring lines from the field stored previously (weaving). Some more advanced flicker fixers integrated in add-on graphics cards use more sophisticated methods. Outputting the image at double scan rate essentially composes a progressive display with all lines from both fields at full vertical refresh rate. This promotes the horizontal frequency of the signal from 15.734 kHz to 31.47 kHz (in the NTSC case, numbers for PAL are slightly lower), which can be the used to drive a VGA monitor from an output device.

== Use with the Amiga ==
One computer capable of producing an interlaced image is the Amiga. The Amiga's default video mode is PAL or NTSC. NTSC and PAL interlaced screens have two fields called odd and even. The fields switch every 60th of a second on NTSC, or 50th of a second on PAL, which allows for higher resolution while using a narrower signal bandwidth than full 50 or 60 FPS progressive video would require, but it can also produce an alarming jittering effect for graphics with high contrast details between fields. This NTSC/PAL compatibility gave the Amiga a distinct edge in uses such as television production and gaming, but since the original Amigas were unable to produce vertically high-resolution displays without flickering this was unsuitable for office-like usage where one might need to work with a clear high-resolution image for several hours. Flicker fixers were devised to remedy this.

The later iteration of the Amiga - the Amiga 3000 had a custom chip called Amber which could perform flicker-fixing on any signal. The ECS and AGA chipset could also output VGA display modes. Commodore offered the A2320 Display Enhancer Board for this purpose, The board fit neatly in a video graphics adapter slot on the A2000 series computer. It supported the new video modes offered by the Enhanced Chip Set (ECS) and AmigaOS 2.0, including the Productivity Mode. Also, the earlier A2024 'Hedley' greyscale monitor featured an integrated flicker fixer, supporting up to 8 shades of grey.

An alternative is a screen cover. Jerry Pournelle reported in 1989 that Flicker Master, "a screen that you Velcro over your Amiga monitor ... reduces the flicker from interlace mode something wonderful ... I wouldn't be without it".
