= Amiga Enhanced Chip Set =

Amiga chipset

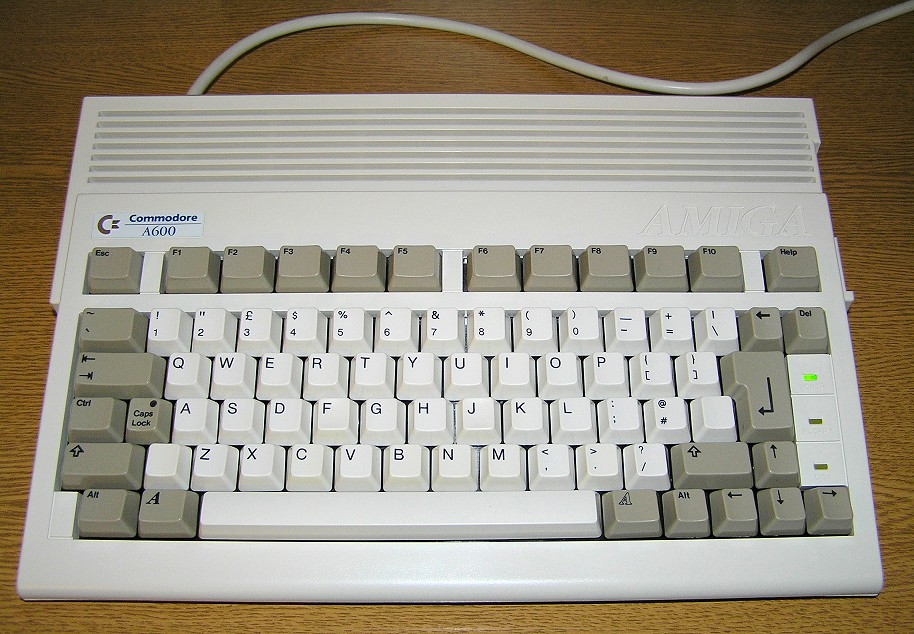
An Amiga600

The Enhanced Chip Set (ECS) is the second generation of the Amiga computer's chipset, offering minor improvements over the original chipset (OCS) design. ECS was introduced in 1990 with the launch of the Amiga 3000. Another version was developed around 1994 but was unreleased due to Commodore International filing for bankruptcy. Amigas produced from 1990 onwards featured a mix of OCS and ECS chips, such as later versions of the Amiga 500 and the Commodore CDTV. Other ECS models were the Amiga 500+ in 1991 and lastly the Amiga 600 in 1992.

== Features ==
The enhanced chip set has two new chips, the 8375 HR Agnus and 8373 HR Denise. The ECS Denise chip offers Productivity VGA output (640×480 non-interlaced) and SuperHiRes (1280×200 or 1280×256) display modes (also available in interlaced mode), which are however limited to only 4 bits on-screen colors. The Productivity output required a multi-sync monitor. It also allowed for a greyscale resolution of 1008 x 800 pixels with the A2024 monitor.

Some Amigas, such as the Amiga 500 and the Amiga 2000 came with the ECS version of the Agnus chip but the original chipset version (OCS) of the Denise chip. It is possible to upgrade one or both of them to obtain partial or full ECS functionality by replacing OCS chips with ECS versions. Not all OCS chipset computers were upgradable, some such as the Amiga 2000-A and the Amiga 1000 had different Agnus sockets.

ECS was followed by the third generation AGA chipset with the launch of the Amiga 4000 and Amiga 1200 in 1992.

== See also ==
- Amiga custom chips
- Amiga Ranger Chipset
- Advanced Graphics Architecture
- Amiga Advanced Architecture chipset
- AA+ Chipset
- Hombre chipset
