= Amiga Hombre chipset =

Commodore Amiga chipset

Hombre is a RISC chipset for the Amiga, designed by Commodore, which was intended as the basis of a range of Amiga personal computers and multimedia products, including a successor to the Amiga 1200, a next generation game machine called CD64 and a 3D accelerator PCI card. Hombre was canceled along with the bankruptcy of Commodore International.

== History ==
In 1993, Commodore International ceased the development of the AAA chipset when they concluded conventional PC clones would have similar performance shortly after the AAA machines would be released.

In the place of AAA, Commodore began to design a new 64-bit 3D graphics chipset based on Hewlett-Packard's PA-RISC architecture to serve as the new basis of the Amiga personal computer series. It was codenamed Hombre (pronounced "ómbre" which means man in Spanish) and was developed in conjunction with Hewlett-Packard over an estimated eighteen-month period.

== Backward compatibility ==
Hombre does not support any planar mode, nor any emulation for the legacy Amiga chipset or Motorola 680x0 CPU registers, so it was completely incompatible with former Amiga models. According to Hombre designer Dr. Ed Hepler, Commodore intended to produce an AGA Amiga upon a single chip to solve the backward compatibility issues. This single chip would include Motorola MC680x0 core, plus the AGA chipset. The chip could be integrated in Hombre based computers for backward compatibility with AGA software.

== Design ==
Hombre is based around two chips: Nathaniel, a System Controller chip, and Natalie, a Display Controller chip.

The System Controller chip was designed by Dr. Ed Hepler, well known as the designer of the AAA Andrea chip. The chip is similar in principle to the chip bus controller found in Agnus, Alice, and Andrea of the Amiga chipsets. Nathaniel features the following:

- An inhouse designed 100+ MHz 64-bit integer PA-RISC microprocessor with SIMD and additional graphics processing related instructions
- An advanced DMA engine and blitter with fixed-point arithmetic 3D texture mapping and gouraud shading using trapezoids as primitives
- 64-bit RISC-like Copper co-processor
- 16-bit resolution sound processor with twelve voices

Additional logic has been included to permit some floating point operations to be performed in hardware; a floating point register file is included.

The inclusion of a double precision floating point unit was also under consideration.

The Display Controller Chip was designed by Tim McDonald, also known as the designer of the AAA Monica chip. It is similar in principle to the Denise, Lisa, and Monica chips found on original Amigas. In addition, the chipset also supported future official or third-party upgrades through extension for an external PA-RISC processor.

Natalie features the following:

- VGA monitor control
- Built in genlock and framegrabber
- Logic for 2 analog game port joysticks

These chips and some other circuitry would be part of a PCI card, through the ReTargetable Graphics system.

Additional IO for peripherals such as floppy drive, keyboard and mice would have been provided with a separate dedicated peripheral ASIC.

There were plans to port the AmigaOS Exec kernel to low-end systems, but this was not possible due to financial troubles facing Commodore at that time. Therefore, a licensed OpenGL library was to be used for the low-end entertainment system.

The original plan for the Hombre-based computer system was to have Windows NT compatibility, with native AmigaOS recompiled for the new big-endian CPU to run legacy 68k Amiga software through emulation. Commodore chose the PA-RISC instruction set over the MIPS architecture and first generation embedded PowerPC microprocessors, mainly because these low-cost microprocessors were unqualified to run Windows NT. This wasn't the case for the 64-bit MIPS R4200, but it was rejected for its high price at the time.

== Features ==
Hombre was designed as a clean break from traditional Amiga chipset architecture with no planar graphics mode support. Hombre also doesn't feature the original eight Amiga sprites, early iterations of Hombre featured a new, incompatible sprite engine but Commodore decided to drop sprites because sprites had become less attractive to developers compared with fast blitters. Despite lack of compatibility, Hombre introduced modern technologies including these:

- Fill rate of 30 million 3D rendered pixels per second
- Special Function Unit (SFU) SIMD extension for rasterizing multiple pixels with a single 64-bit operation
- 16-bit chunky graphic modes (to reduce costs, Commodore abandoned 256 color mode with Color LUT registers)
- 32-bit chunky with 8-bit alpha channel
- 1280 × 1024 pixel progressive resolution with a 24-bit color palette
- One sprite with a 24-bit color palette, used for the mouse pointer
- Four scalable playfields, each with their own graphics mode (e.g. 16bpp, HAM-8)
- 512 25-bit color look up tables (24-bit color + 1 bit for genlock)
- 3D texture mapping engine
- Gouraud shading
- Z-buffering
- YUV compatibility with JPEG support
- Standard TV and HDTV compatibility
- 64-bit internal data bus and registers

The chipset could be sold either as a high end PCI graphics card with minimal peripherals ASICs and 64-bit DRAM, or as a lower cost CD-ROM based game system (CD64) using cheap 32-bit DRAM. It could also be used for set-top box embedded systems.

According to Dr. Ed Hepler, Hombre was to be fabricated in 0.6 µm 3-level metal CMOS with the help of Hewlett-Packard. HP had fabricated the AGA Lisa chip and collaborated in the design of the AAA chipset.

Commodore was planning to adopt the Acutiator architecture designed by Dave Haynie for Hombre before it filed bankruptcy and went out of business.

== See also ==
- PA-RISC family processors
- Original Amiga chipset
- Amiga Ranger Chipset
- Enhanced Chip Set
- Amiga Advanced Graphics Architecture
- Advanced Amiga Architecture chipset
