= Amiga Ranger Chipset =

Amiga Ranger
- Developer: Commodore International
- Manufacturer: Commodore International
- Product family: Amiga
- Type: Personal computer
- Generation: Unreleased prototype
- Lifespan: 1986–1987 (development period)
- CPU: 68010 or 68020
- Memory: 2 MB chip RAM
- Display: 1024×1024 pixel
- Graphics: 1024×1024 pixels with 128 colors (7-bit color depth)
- Successor: ECS and AAA chipsets
- Related: Amiga 1000, Amiga 2000

Amiga Ranger is an unreleased prototype personal computer by Commodore which was intended to be the second generation Amiga chipset, prior to ECS. It was designed by the original Los Gatos Amiga team including Jay Miner.

== Overview ==
After the release of the Amiga 1000, Jay Miner began to design its intended successor, between 1986 and 1987. Code-named Amiga Ranger, it was planned to be highly expandable like Amiga 2000 with better graphics and CPU. The Ranger is said to have possibly included a 68010 or 68020 CPU.

Information for this new chipset remains unclear. However, the sound system may have still been the same as the original chipset. According to RJ Mical, the new chipset kept the original 13-bit DAC for its CLUT but with quadrupled color registers from 32 to 128. The color palette would have remained at 4096 colors but the resolution could go up to 1024×1024 pixels with 128 colors (7-bit color depth). Additionally the chipset can address up to 2 MB of Chip RAM space.

Ranger used 2 MB VRAM as chip memory. In an interview, Jay Miner described benefits of using VRAM instead of DRAM; this gave the display system enough memory bandwidth for 1024×1024 pixel displays. From the known specification, it could be said that Ranger chipset was designed to compete with the Sharp X68000 and Apple Macintosh II personal computers (both released in 1987) which take advantage of VRAM technology.

Jay Miner made sure that the Ranger chipset was completed and fully tested before he left Commodore in hope that one day the company would release it. But at that time, VRAM was considered expensive compared to DRAM, so Commodore refused to release Ranger for its high price which was unsuitable for the low-end systems like Amiga 500 to cover its costs. Dale Luck is in possession of a Ranger system prototype, but it's unknown what state it is in.

In a few years, VRAM costs dropped to be only 20% more than DRAM, so Commodore planned to use VRAM in the AAA chipset, the next-gen Amiga chipset left in an unfinished state when the company went into voluntary liquidation in 1994.

Some thoughts of a built-in blitter per playfield designed in Ranger had been rejected by Dave Haynie. However, a post on Team Amiga explained the Ranger idea:

The "Ranger" was the code-name for the A1000-followup idea/project/notion/whatever being advocated by the Los Gatos Amiga group. It may have been 68010 with or without simple MMU, or with 68020, or with virtually any other magical thing you can imagine, including way better Amiga chips (already designed and working, only Commodore refused to release them), etc. Basically, "Ranger" became a kind of catch all for anything anyone ever believed would have been done better had Los Gatos not lost out over Commodore Germany's Amiga 2000 configuration (which, itself, was nothing more than an A1000 with Zorro backplane attached and the slot form-factor changed to permit this bridge card idea; Germany also being where Commodore PCs came from, at the time). I of course inherited this form factor and design spec when I took on the A2000-CR project in West Chester. I did manage to improve a few details (real CPU slot, real Video slot), as well as using the Amiga 500 architecture and integrating the expansion logic.

There's no question a "Ranger" project did exist in some form at Los Gatos. Far as I know, it was never completed, though I wasn't out there. It made the transition from "legend" to "myth" over ten years ago, I'm afraid, gaining new powers with each retelling, after the fashion of all good myths.

== See also ==
- Original Amiga chipset
- Enhanced Chip Set
- Advanced Graphics Architecture
- AAA chipset
- Hombre chipset
- Sharp X68000
- List of home computers by video hardware
