= Amiga 1200 =

1992 personal computer

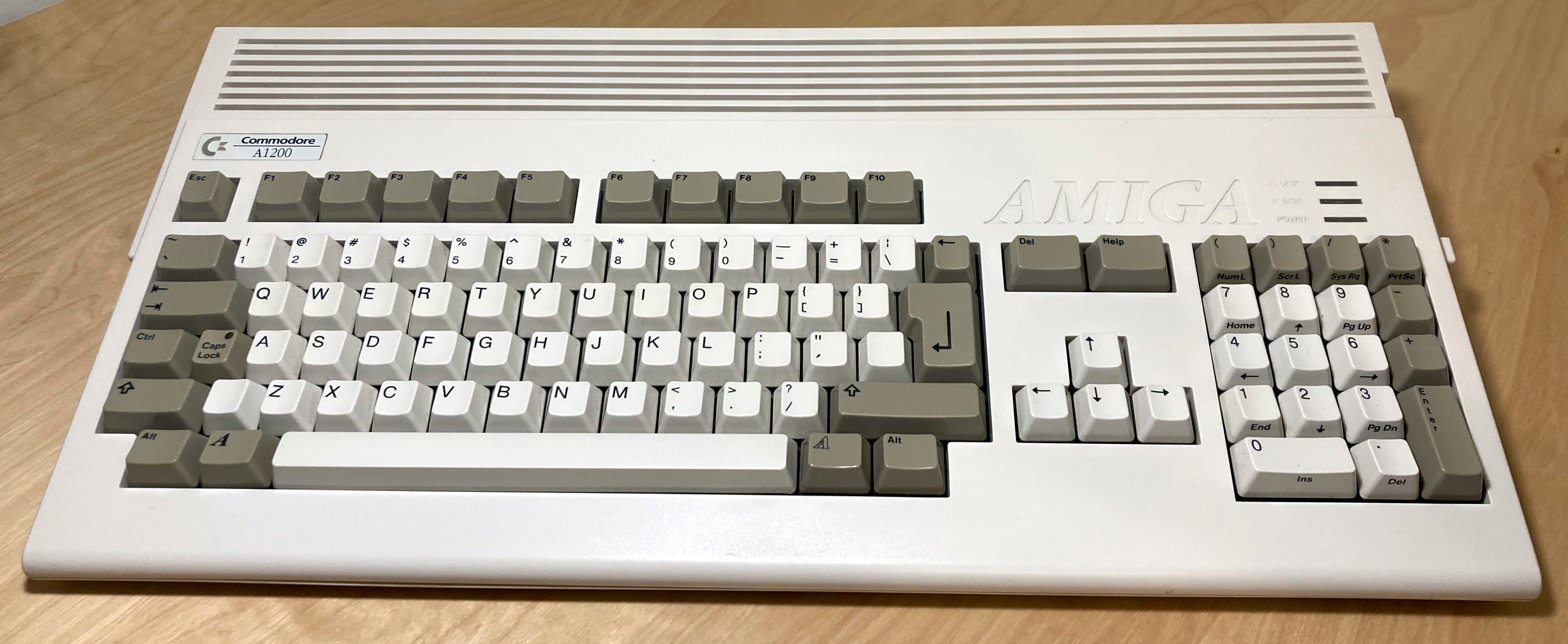
- Manufacturer: Commodore International, Amiga Technologies GmbH (Escom AG)
- Type: Personal computer
- Released: 21 October 1992; 34 years ago
- Introductory price: £399 (equivalent to £880 in 2025); US$699 (equivalent to $1,600 in 2025)
- Discontinued: 1996
- Units sold: 95,500 units in Germany
- Operating system: AmigaOS 3.0/3.1
- CPU: Motorola 68EC020 @ 14 MHz
- Memory: 2 MB
- Predecessor: Amiga 500, Amiga 500 Plus
- Related: Amiga 600

The Amiga 1200, or A1200 (code-named "Channel Z"), is a personal computer in the Amiga computer family released by Commodore International, aimed at the home computer market. It was launched on October 21, 1992, at a base price of £399 in the United Kingdom (equivalent to £880 in 2025) and $599 in the United States (equivalent to $1,370 in 2025).

== History ==
The A1200 was launched a few months after the Amiga 600, using a similar slimline design that replaced the earlier Amiga 500 Plus and Amiga 500. Whereas the A600 used the 16-bit Motorola 68000 of earlier Amigas, the A1200 was built around the 32-bit Motorola 68EC020. Physically, the A1200 is an all-in-one design incorporating the CPU, keyboard, and disk drives (including the option of an internal 2.5" hard disk drive) in one physical unit. The A1200's hardware architecture was later used as the basis for Commodore's Amiga CD32 game console in 1993.

Initially, only 30,000 A1200s were available at the UK launch. During the first year of its life the system reportedly sold well, but Commodore ran into cash flow problems and filed for bankruptcy. Worldwide sales figures for the A1200 are unknown, but 95,000 systems were sold in Germany before Commodore's bankruptcy.

After Commodore's demise in 1994, the A1200 almost disappeared from the market but was later relaunched by Escom in 1995. The new Escom A1200 was priced at £399, and it came bundled with two games, seven applications and AmigaOS 3.1. It was initially criticized for being priced £150 higher than the Commodore variant that had been sold for two years prior. It also came with a modified PC floppy disk drive that is incompatible with some Amiga software. The A1200 was finally discontinued in 1996 as the parent company folded.

== Design improvements ==
The A1200 offers a number of advantages over earlier lower-budget Amiga models. It is a 32-bit design; the 68EC020 microprocessor is faster than the 68000 and has 2 MB of RAM as standard. The AGA chipset used in the A1200 is a significant improvement. AGA increases the color palette from 4096 colors to 16.8 million colors with up to 256 on-screen colors normally, and an improved HAM mode allowing 262,144 on-screen colors. The graphics hardware also features improved sprite capacity and faster graphics performance mainly due to faster video memory. Additionally, compared to the A600 the A1200 offers greater expansion possibilities.

== Popularity and criticism ==
Although it is a significant upgrade, the A1200 did not sell as well as the 500 and proved to be Commodore's last lower-budget model before filing for bankruptcy in 1994. This is mainly because the 1200 failed to repeat the technological advantage over competitors like the first Amiga systems. The AGA chipset was something of a disappointment. Commodore had initially been working on a much-improved version of the original Amiga chipset, codenamed "AAA", but when development fell behind they rushed out the less-improved AGA, found on the A4000 and CD32 units. While AGA is not notably less capable than its competition, when compared to VGA and its emerging extensions, the Amiga no longer commanded the lead it had in earlier times. Additionally, the Amiga's custom chips cost more to produce than the increasingly ubiquitous commodity chips utilized in PCs, making the A1200 more expensive. Some industry commentators also felt that the 68020 microprocessor was already too outdated and that the new system should have been fitted with a 68030 to be competitive. Another issue was that the A1200 never supported high-density floppy disks without a special external drive or unreliable hacks, despite the (downgraded) PC HD drive in Escom models.

The gaming market, which had been a major factor in the A500's popularity, was becoming ever more competitive with the emergence of more advanced and less expensive fourth generation console gaming systems, and multimedia-enabled IBM PC compatibles. As a result, fewer retailers carried the A1200, especially in North America. The A1200 also received bad press for being incompatible with a number of Amiga 500 games. Further criticism was directed at the A1200's power supply, which is often inadequate in expanded systems, limiting upgrade options that had been popular with earlier Amiga models. Due to fewer sales and short lifetime, not as many games were produced for the A1200 than for the previous generations of Amiga computers. In the demoscene Amiga 1200 (usually with CPU upgrades) replaced earlier Amigas and was a popular demo making platform throughout the 1990s and beyond.

The Amiga 1200 was developed and released during the waning days of the home computer market its manufacturer once dominated. While Commodore never released any official sales figures, Commodore Frankfurt gave a figure of 95,000 Amiga 1200 systems sold in Germany.

== Technical information ==
=== Processor and RAM ===
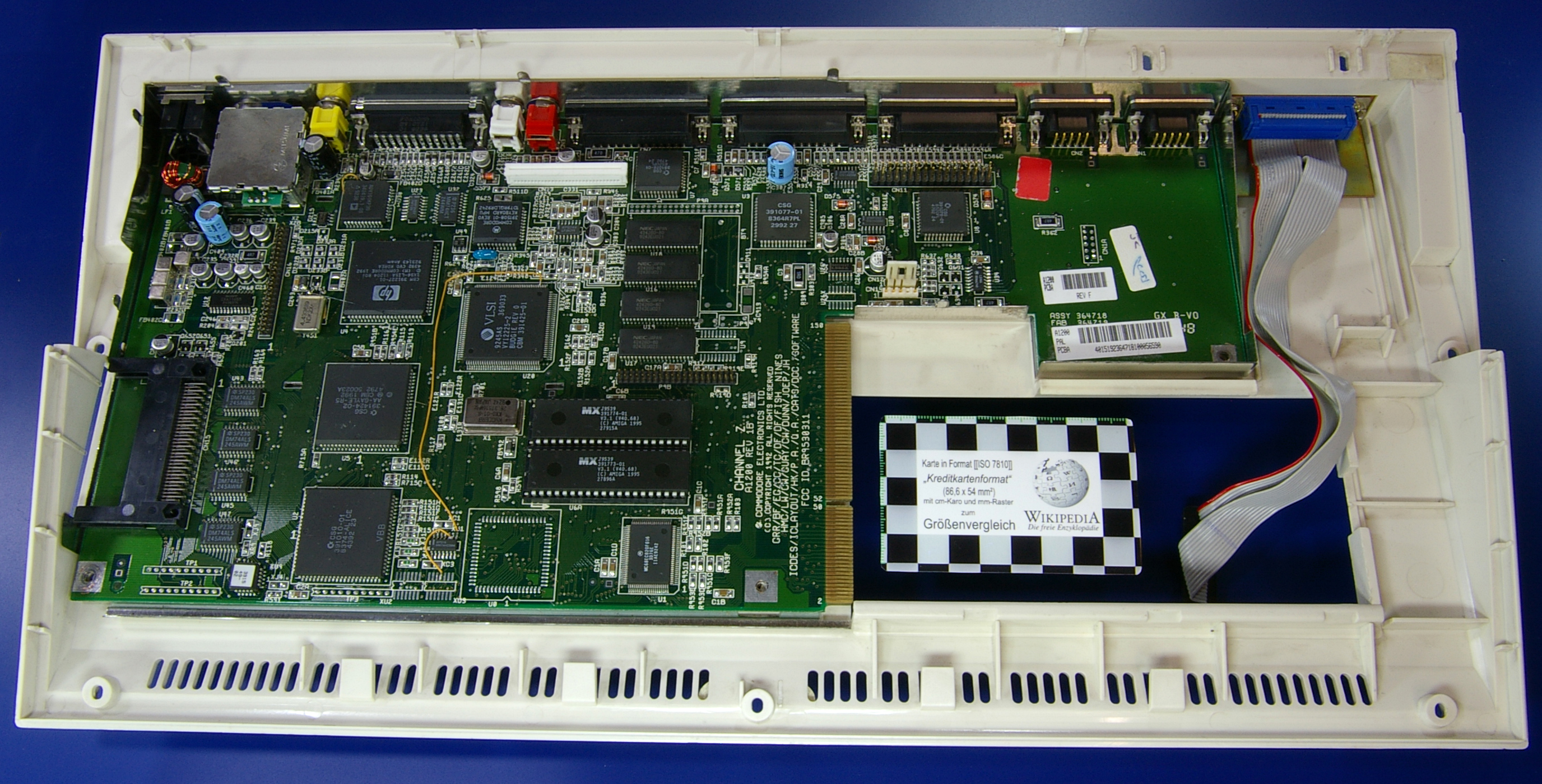
An Amiga 1200 main board

The A1200 has a Motorola 68EC020 CPU. It is noteworthy that, like the 68000, the 68EC020 has a 24-bit address space, allowing for a theoretical maximum of 16 MB of memory. A stock A1200 has 2 MB of in-built "chip RAM". (Chip RAM cannot be expanded beyond 2 MB.) Up to 8 MB of "fast RAM" can be added in the "trap-door" expansion slot, which approximately doubles (~2.26×) the speed of a stock machine. Various CPU upgrades featuring 68020, 68030, 68040, 68060 and even PowerPC processors were made available by third-party developers. Such upgrades typically utilize faster and greater-capacity memory (up to 256 MB).

=== Graphics and sound ===
The A1200 shipped with Commodore's third-generation Amiga chipset, the Advanced Graphics Architecture (AGA), which features improved graphical abilities in comparison to the earlier generations.

However, the sound hardware remains identical to the design used in the Amiga 1000, though the AGA chipset allows higher sampling rates for sound playback, either by using a video mode with higher horizontal scan rate or by using the CPU to drive audio output directly.

=== Peripherals and expansion ===
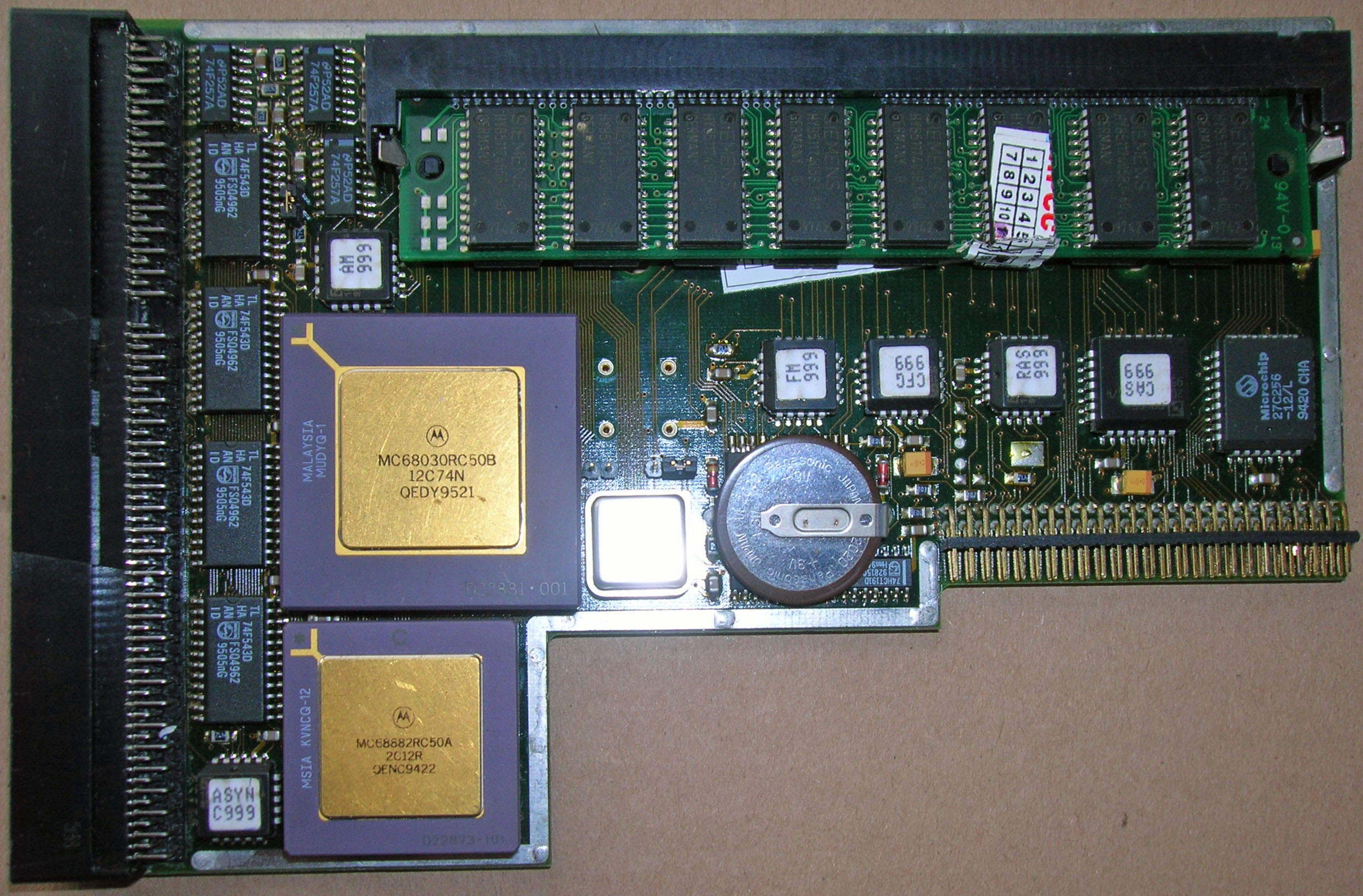
A Blizzard 1230 Mk III accelerator board

Like earlier models, the A1200 features several Amiga-specific connectors including two DE9M ports for joysticks, mice, and light pens, a standard 25-pin RS-232 serial port and a 25-pin Centronics parallel port. As a result, the A1200 is compatible with many existing Amiga peripherals, such as external floppy disk drives, MIDI devices, sound samplers and video capture devices.

Like the Amiga 600, the A1200 features a PCMCIA Type II slot and an internal 44-pin ATA interface, both most commonly seen on laptop computers. The A1200 has internal housing for one 2.5" internal hard disk drive connecting to the ATA controller, though it is also possible to accommodate slim 3.5" drives with suitable cabling and fixings. The 16-bit PCMCIA Type II interface allows use of a number of compatible peripherals available for the laptop market, although only 16-bit 5V-capable PCMCIA cards are hardware compatible; newer 32-bit PC Card (CardBus) peripherals are incompatible, as well as 16-bit 3.3V-only cards. Mechanically, only Type I and Type II cards fit in the slot; thicker Type III cards will not fit (although they may connect if the A1200 is removed from its original case). The slot is also designed to prevent insertion of 3.3V-only cards. The PCMCIA implementation is almost identical to the one featured on the earlier A600. A number of Amiga peripherals were released by third-party developers for this connector including SRAM cards, CD-ROM controllers, SCSI controllers, network cards, sound samplers and video capture devices. Later, a number of compatible laptop peripherals have been made to operate with this port including serial modems, network cards, and CompactFlash adapters.

In addition the A1200 features a 32-bit CPU/RAM expansion slot and a unique feature, the so-called "clock port", which is a remnant of an abandoned design feature for addition of internal RAM and a real-time clock. Later, third-party developers put it to use by creating an array of expansions for the A1200, such as I/O cards, audio cards, and even a USB controller. Several CPU boards also have integrated SCSI controllers or even the option to add a graphics card.

The revision of the A1200 manufactured by Escom was fitted with PC-based "high-density" floppy-disk drives that had been downgraded to double-density drives. This resulted in some software incompatibility as PC-style drives do not supply a "ready" signal, which signals the presence of a floppy in the disk drive. Escom released a free circuit upgrade to correct this issue.

=== Operating system ===
The first incarnation of the A1200 shipped with Workbench 3.0 and Kickstart 3.0 (revision 39.106), which together provide standard single-user operating system functionality and support for the built-in hardware. The later models, from Escom and Amiga Technologies, shipped with Workbench 3.1 and Kickstart 3.1 (AmigaOS 3.1), though earlier A1200 models can be upgraded by installing compatible Kickstart 3.1 ROM chips. The later AmigaOS 3.5 and 3.9 releases are software-only updates requiring Kickstart 3.1.

AmigaOS 4, a PowerPC-native release of the operating system, can be used with the A1200 provided Blizzard PPC PowerPC board is installed. Likewise, MorphOS, an alternative Amiga-compatible operating system, can be used with this hardware.

Variants of platform-independent operating systems such as Linux and BSD, and AROS, an open-source alternative Amiga-compatible operating system can also be used with the A1200.

=== Specifications ===
Attribute	Specification
Processor	Motorola 68EC020 at 14.32 MHz (NTSC) or 14.18 MHz (PAL)
RAM	2 MB Amiga Chip RAM Upgradeable by a further: 8 MB in the expansion slot without CPU upgrade; 256 MB in the expansion slot with CPU upgrade; 4 MB in PCMCIA slot
ROM	512 KB Kickstart ROM
Chipset	Advanced Graphics Architecture (AGA)
Video	24-bit color palette (16.8 million colors) Up to 256 on-screen colors in indexed mode 262,144 on-screen colors in HAM-8 mode Resolutions from: 320×200 to 1280×400i, 1504x484 overscan (NTSC); 320×256 to 1280×512i, 1504x576 overscan (PAL); 640×480 (VGA); 800×600i, 1024×768i (not officially supported)
Audio	4 × 8-bit PCM channels (2 stereo channels) 28–56 kHz maximum DMA sampling rate (dependent on video mode in use)
Removable storage	3.5-inch DD floppy disk drive (880 KB capacity)
Internal storage	Housing for 2.5-inch IDE hard disk drive
Audio/video out	Analog RGB video out (DB-23M) Composite video out (RCA); RF audio/video out (RCA); Audio out (2× RCA)
Input/output ports	2× mouse/gamepad ports (DE9) RS-232 serial port (DB-25M); Centronics-style parallel port (DB-25F); Floppy disk drive port (DB-23F); 44-pin ATA controller supporting PIO-0 transfer mode (internal); 16-bit Type II PCMCIA slot
Expansion slots	150-pin local expansion port (trapdoor) 22-pin clockport
Operating system	AmigaOS 3.0/3.1. (Kickstart 3.0-3.1/Workbench 3.0-3.1)
Physical dimensions	470 × 241 × 76.2 mm (W × D × H) 3.6 kg
Other	Integrated keyboard with 96 keys (including 10 function keys)

== Bundled software ==
Some software officially bundled with the A1200 included Deluxe Paint IV AGA (a 2D image and animation editor) and Final Copy (a word processor). The Amiga Technologies/Escom version was bundled with applications such as Scala (multimedia authoring software) and Wordworth (a word processor), and games like Pinball Mania and Whizz.

In the UK the Amiga 1200 was available in a Desktop Dynamite bundle which contained Workbench 3.0, Deluxe Paint IV AGA, Wordworth and two games: Oscar and Dennis. There was also a Comic relief version that came bundled with the game Sleepwalker. Later packs included a cut-down version of the graphics software Photogenics.

== See also ==
- List of Amiga models and variants
