= Amiga Halfbrite mode =

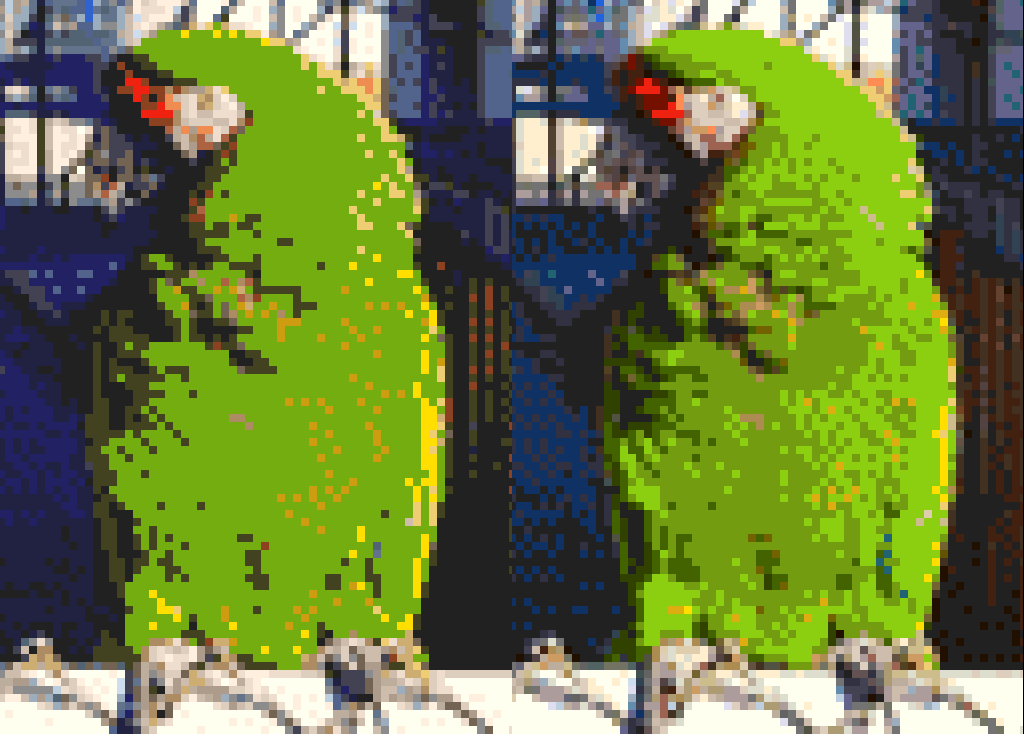
A normal 32 color image can be compared to an Extra Half Brite 64 color image.

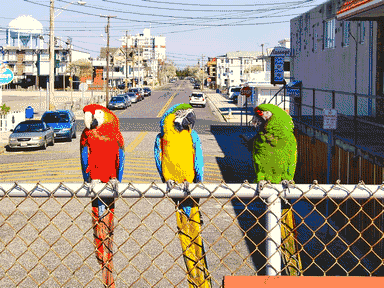
Extra Half Brite 64 color mode picture

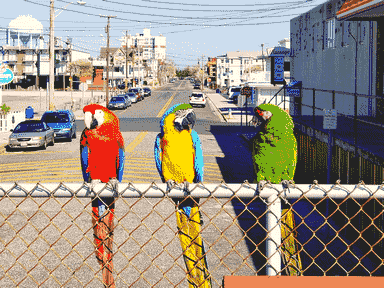
Normal 32 color mode picture

Extra Half Brite (also referred to as Extra-Half-Brite, Extra-Halfbrite, or EHB), is a planar display mode of the Amiga computer.

This mode uses six bit planes (six bits per pixel). The first five bit planes index 32 colors selected from a 12-bit color space of 4096 possible colors. If the bit on the sixth bit plane is set, the display hardware halves the brightness of the corresponding color component. This way 64 simultaneous colors are possible (32 arbitrary colors plus 32 half-bright components) while using only 32 color registers. The number of color registers is a hardware limitation of pre-AGA chipsets in Amiga computers.

Some contemporary games (Fusion, Defender of the Crown, Agony, Lotus II, or Unreal) and animations (HalfBrite Hill) use EHB mode as a hardware-assisted means to display shadows or silhouettes. EHB is often used as general-purpose 64 color mode with its own restrictions.

Some early versions of the first Amiga, the Amiga 1000, sold in the United States, lack the EHB video mode, which is present in all later Amiga models.

== See also ==
- Original Chip Set
- Hold-And-Modify
