= Amiga Advanced Graphics Architecture =

Amiga graphic chipset

Amiga Advanced Graphics Architecture (AGA) is the third-generation Amiga graphic chipset, first used in the Amiga 4000 in 1992. Before release AGA was codenamed Pandora by Commodore International.

== Overview ==
AGA was originally called AA for Advanced Architecture in the United States. The name was later changed to AGA for the European market to reflect that it largely improved the graphical subsystem, and to avoid trademark issues.

AGA is able to display graphics modes with a depth of up to 8 bits per pixel. This allows for 256 colors in indexed display modes and 262,144 colors (18-bit) in Hold-And-Modify (HAM-8) modes. The palette for the AGA chipset has 256 entries from 16,777,216 colors (24-bit), whereas previous chipsets, the Original Chip Set (OCS) and Enhanced Chip Set (ECS), only allow 32 colors out of 4096 or 64 colors in Amiga Extra Half-Brite (EHB mode). Other features added to AGA over ECS are super-hi-res smooth scrolling and 32-bit fast page memory fetches to supply the graphics data bandwidth for 8 bitplane graphics modes and wider sprites.

AGA is an incremental upgrade, rather than the dramatic upgrade of the other chipset that Commodore had begun in 1988, the Amiga Advanced Architecture chipset (AAA), lacking many features that would have made it competitive with other graphic chipsets of its time. Apart from the graphics data fetches, AGA still operates on 16-bit data only, meaning that significant bandwidth is wasted during register accesses and copper and blitter operations. Also the lack of a chunky graphics mode is a speed impediment to graphics operations not tailored for planar modes, resulting in ghost artifacts during the common productivity task of scrolling. In practice, the AGA HAM mode is mainly useful in paint programs, picture viewers, and for video playback. Workbench in 256 colors is much slower than ECS operation modes for normal application use; a workaround is to use multiple screens with different color depths. AGA lacks flicker free higher resolution modes, being only able to display 640 × 480 at 72 Hz flicker-free operation. 800 × 600 mode is rarely used as it can only operate at a flickering 60 Hz interlaced mode. In contrast, higher-end PC systems of this era can operate 1024 × 768 at 72 Hz with a full 256-color display. AGA's highest resolution is 1440 × 580 (262 144 colors) in interlaced 50 Hz PAL mode, when overscan is used.

These missed opportunities in the AGA upgrade contributed to the Amiga ultimately losing technical leadership in the area of multimedia. After the long-delayed AAA was finally suspended, AGA was to be succeeded by the Hombre chipset, but this was ultimately cancelled due to Commodore's bankruptcy.

AGA is present in the CD32, Amiga 1200, and Amiga 4000.

== Technical details ==
In order to increase memory bandwidth, the Chip RAM data bus was extended to 32-bit width as in the A3000 (unlike AGA, the A3000's Chip RAM is 32-bit for CPU access only) and the Alice chip (replacing OCS/ECS Agnus) was improved to be able to support full-width access for bitplane DMA. Bandwidth was doubled again (to 4x) by using Fast Page Mode RAM. Lisa (replacing former Denise) adds support for 8-bit bitplane data fetches, 256 instances of 24-bit palette registers, and for 32-bit data transfer for bitplane graphic and sprites.

The rest of the chipset remains unchanged, as do the Blitter and Copper coprocessors in Alice, still working on 16-bit data.

== See also ==
- Original Amiga chipset (OCS)
- Advanced Amiga Architecture chipset (AAA chipset)
- Amiga Enhanced Chip Set (ECS)
- Amiga Ranger Chipset
- Commodore AA+ Chipset (AA+)
- Amiga Hombre chipset
- List of home computers by video hardware
