= Dave Haynie =

American electrical engineer

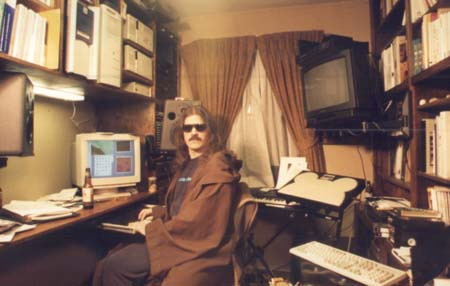
Dave Haynie in the late 1990s

Dave Haynie is an American electrical engineer and was chief engineer at Commodore International. He is vocal in the Amiga community.

Haynie also narrated and produced "Deathbed Vigil," a documentary film that captured the final days of Commodore.
