= Amiga, Inc. (South Dakota) =

Personal computer company in South Dakota, US

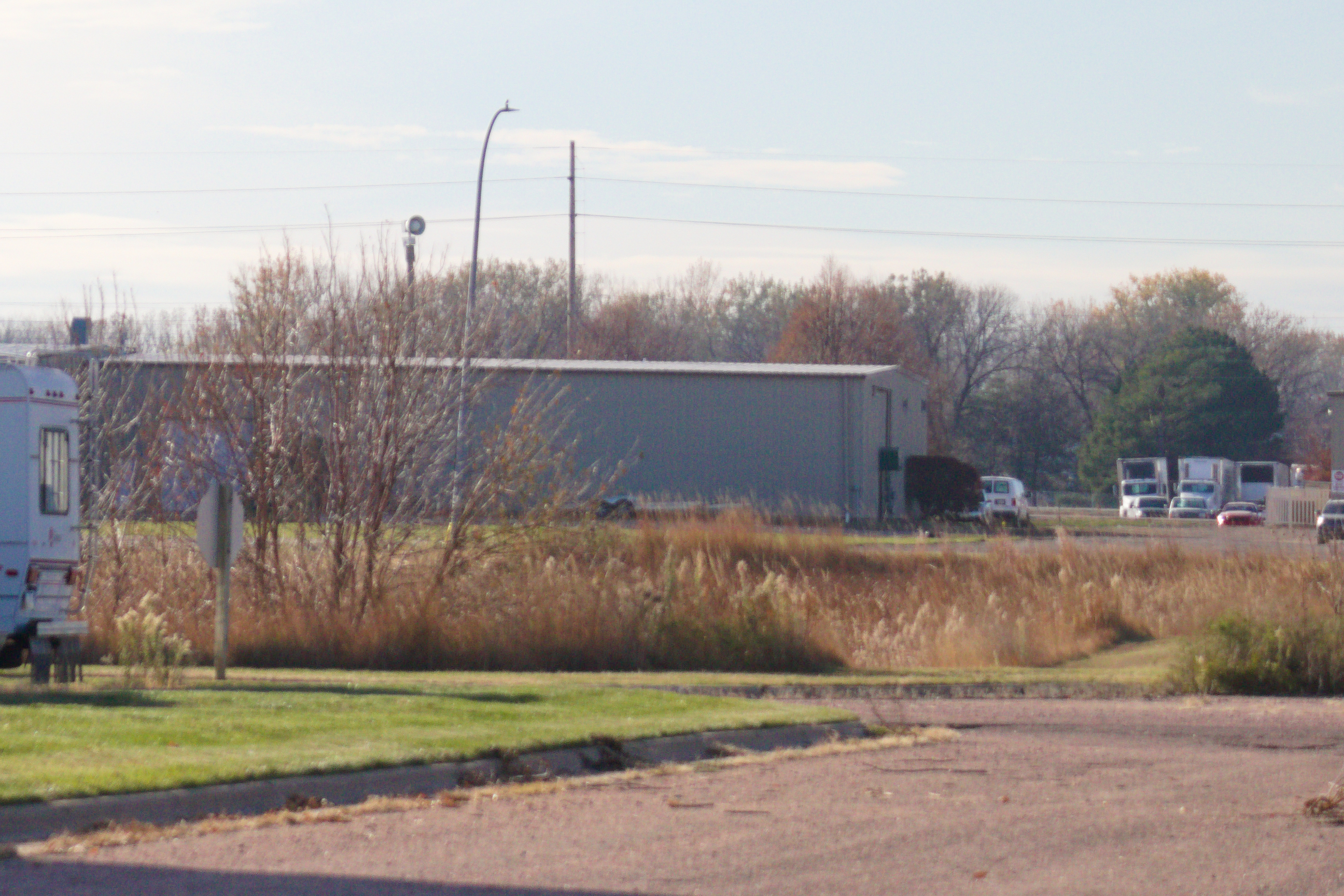
- Rear of site of former headquarters in North Sioux City, South Dakota
- Type: Subsidiary
- Founded: 1997; 29 years ago
- Defunct: 1999
- Headquarters: 600 N. Derby Lane, North Sioux City, South Dakota
- Key people: Jeff Schindler, Jim Collas, Tom Schmidt, Darreck Lisle, Marilyn Flint, Allan Havemose, Joe Torre, Kelli Newby, née Macomber
- Products: A1200, Power A5000, AmigaOS 4, AmigaOS 5
- Number of employees: 5
- Parent: Gateway 2000, Inc.

Amiga, Inc. was a personal computer company based in South Dakota, originally a wholly owned subsidiary of Gateway 2000, Inc., predating the Amiga, Inc. of Washington. It was based upon the intellectual property of the German company Escom AG, and had descended from the original Commodore Amiga personal computer series from the 1980s and 1990s.

== History ==
This instance of Amiga, Inc. was incorporated in South Dakota in 1997, as a wholly owned subsidiary of Gateway 2000, Inc. (later renamed Gateway, Inc.) After acquiring from the German company Escom AG certain Amiga-related intellectual property assets in 1997, Gateway decided to keep the patents, and try to run Amiga, Inc. as a separate unit. It was originally intended to develop two new operating systems, announced as "AmigaOS 4" and "AmigaOS 5". Amiga, Inc. was initially led by Jeff Schindler, then by Jim Collas, and later by Tom Schmidt. Other employees included Darreck Lisle (event coordinator), Marylin Flint (operations manager), Joe Torre (senior engineer) and Kelli Newby, née Macomber, (executive administrative assistant). Independent subcontractors who also briefly worked (without being hired) for Amiga, Inc. included William "Bill" McEwen and Barrie Jon "Fleecy" Moss.

In 1999, when Gateway closed Amiga, Inc., Bill McEwen and Fleecy Moss obtained from Gateway the amiga.com Internet domain and a license to incorporate a new independent company, also named Amiga, Inc., but incorporated in the state of Washington.

== See also ==
- Amiga, Inc.
- Amiga Corporation
