= Maxi Switch =

Defunct American electronics company

Maxi Switch, Inc.
- Formerly: Maxi Switch Company
- Company type: Private
- Industry: Electronics
- Founded: 1968; 58 years ago in Minneapolis, Minnesota, United States
- Founder: Glenn M. Stout
- Defunct: December 2009; 16 years ago
- Fate: Dissolution
- Headquarters: Tucson, Arizona, United States (1984–2009)
- Products: Computer keyboards
- Parent: EECO, Inc. (1984–1990); Silitek (1990–2002); Lite-On (2002–2009)
- Website: maxiswitch.com (archived)

The Maxi Switch Company, later Maxi Switch, Inc. (stylized as Maxi-Switch), was an American electronics manufacturer active from 1968 to 2009. The company primarily manufactured and sold computer keyboards, although it also acted as a contract manufacturer for larger companies. The company was originally founded in Minneapolis, Minnesota but moved to Tucson, Arizona, in the late 1980s following its acquisition by EECO, Inc., a California-based electronics company. In 1990, it was acquired by the Taiwanese electronics company Silitek. Maxi Switch remained a division of all these companies before quietly dissolving in 2009.

== History ==
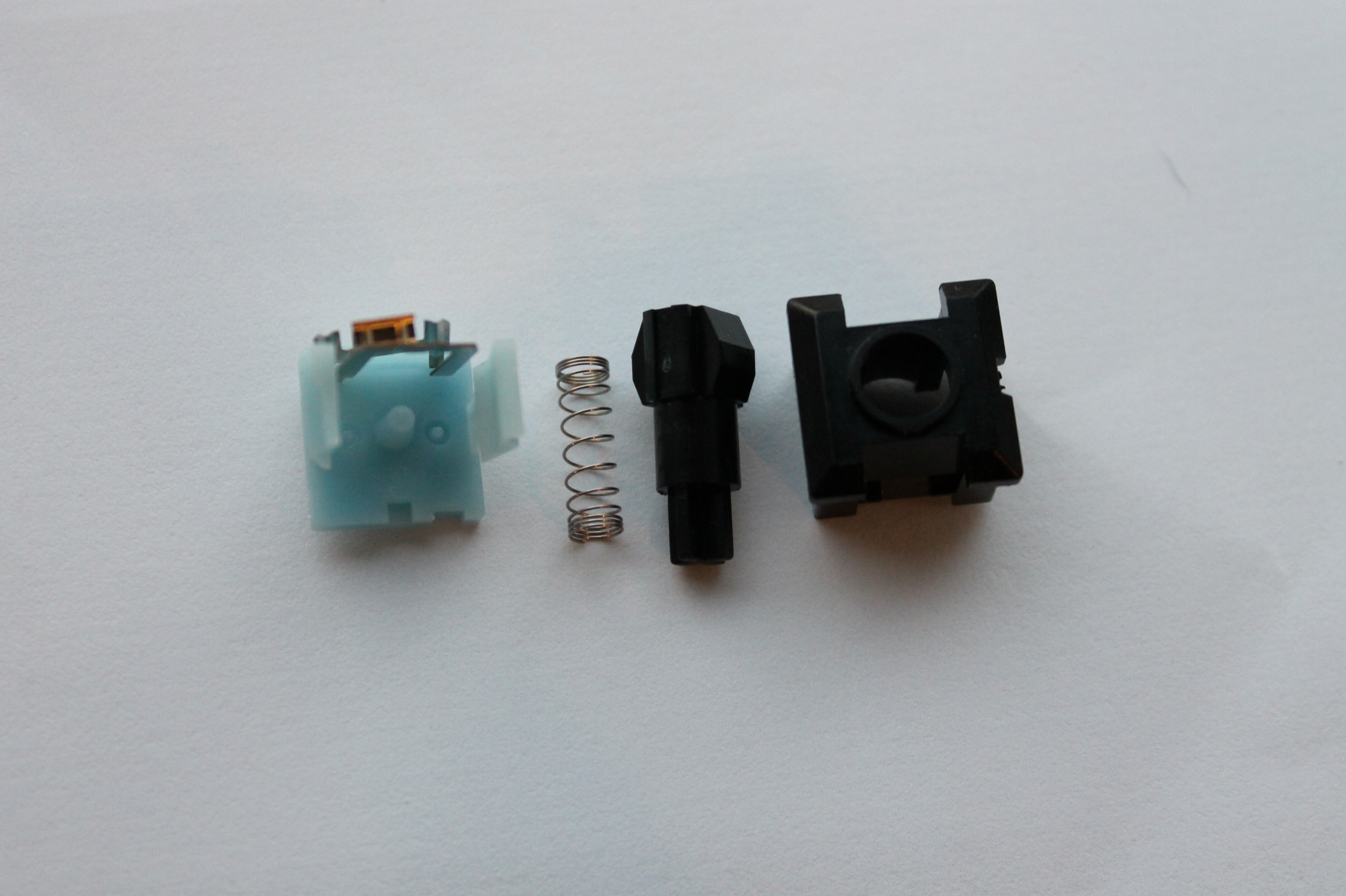
Internals of a keyswitch manufactured by Maxi Switch c. 1982

Maxi Switch was founded in Minneapolis, Minnesota, in 1968 by Glenn M. Stout (1924–2004). The company started out as a manufacturer of keyswitch assemblies for jukeboxes and other electrical equipment, designing so-called keystrips, which were one-dimensional arrays of keyswitches either wired individually or electromechanically linked. By the early 1970s, the company had in its catalog, among other products, illuminated keyswitch assemblies, as well as keystrips that were interlinked with one another to encode bits of information in binary-coded decimal.

In June 1972, Maxi Switch acquired the keyboard and keyswitch patents and assets from Amphenol Corporation, then owned by Bunker Ramo. This acquisition allowed Maxi Switch to fully break into the computer industry. By 1982, the company was manufacturing 500,000 computer keyboard assemblies annually for companies including Xerox, Tandy (then the owners of Radio Shack), and Kaypro, generating $7.5 million in sales. The company had a worldwide presence, manufacturing keyboards with different layouts for international markets such as Germany, France, and Greece, among others. In 1983, it even produced a keyboard for the IBM PC in the Dvorak layout, being one of the first companies to offer a dedicated Dvorak computer keyboard.

In March 1984, Maxi Switch agreed to be acquired by EECO, Inc., a manufacturer of AV gear and computer hardware based in Santa Ana, California, for between $3.4 million to $5 million in cash. The acquisition was finalized in April 1984. Craig Stout, the son of Glenn M. Stout, took over as CEO of Maxi Switch in January 1985, following Glenn's poor health. Under ownership of EECO, Maxi Switch opened an assembly plant in Tucson, Arizona, as well as keyswitch manufacturing plants in Caborca, and Scotland, and a keypad manufacturing plant in Phoenix, Arizona. Revenues at Maxi Switch peaked at $40 million in 1987 before declining to $10 million in 1989. EECO itself filed for Chapter 11 bankruptcy, putting Maxi Switch on the market to be acquired by another company as a consequence.

In August 1990, Silitek of Taiwan agreed to purchase Maxi Switch from EECO, Inc., for an undisclosed sum. Silitek retained ownership of Maxi Switch's Tucson plant, naming it the headquarters of Maxi Switch, while the Caborca plant was sold back to a group of Mexican investors formerly employed by EECO, who nonetheless continued to supply keyboards to Silitek. The Scotland and Phoenix plants, meanwhile, remained property of EECO, who signed a non-exclusive agreement with Silitek to produce keyboards on a contract basis.

In the early 1990s, Maxi Switch signed a contract with Gateway 2000 to produce the Gateway AnyKey, a programmable computer keyboard that was sold as an option for some of Gateway's desktop computers. Gateway introduced the AnyKey in the spring of 1991. It was also sold by Maxi Switch themselves, as the ProKey II (later the ProKey 124). The AnyKey proved very popular, especially among power users and computer programmers, and soon gained a cult following.

By 1992, Maxi Switch was producing 60,000 keyboards a month from its Tucson headquarters and plant. That year, it also began producing game cartridges for Sega and its Genesis; the following year, it began producing select hardware components for Nintendo's game consoles, including the Game Boy. Starting in 1994, Maxi Switch branched out to the healthcare sector, producing SMT circuit boards for medical devices and exercise equipment. In December 1995, Maxi Switch acquired several buckling spring keyboard designs from Lexmark, formerly a division of IBM, allowing the company to produce derivatives of the highly popular Model M keyboard.

Silitek itself was absorbed by its parent company Lite-On in 2002, with Maxi Switch surviving as a division thereafter. Maxi Switch ultimately dissolved in December 2009.

== See also ==
- Keyboard technology
