= Remapping =

Remapping may refer to:

- Tuning an engine for better performance or fuel efficiency by remapping the Engine control unit
- Redefining keys on a keyboard, for example Gateway_AnyKey#Programming
- Sector remapping, the automatic replacement of bad sectors by good ones in a hard disk drive
