= A5000 =

A5000 may refer to:

- Yamaha A5000, a sampler
- Power A5000, a planned computer from Power
- Acorn A5000, a computer
- A5000 road (Great Britain)
- Sony α5000, an ILCE camera
