= Gateway HandBook =

Subnotebook sold by Gateway 2000

HandBook
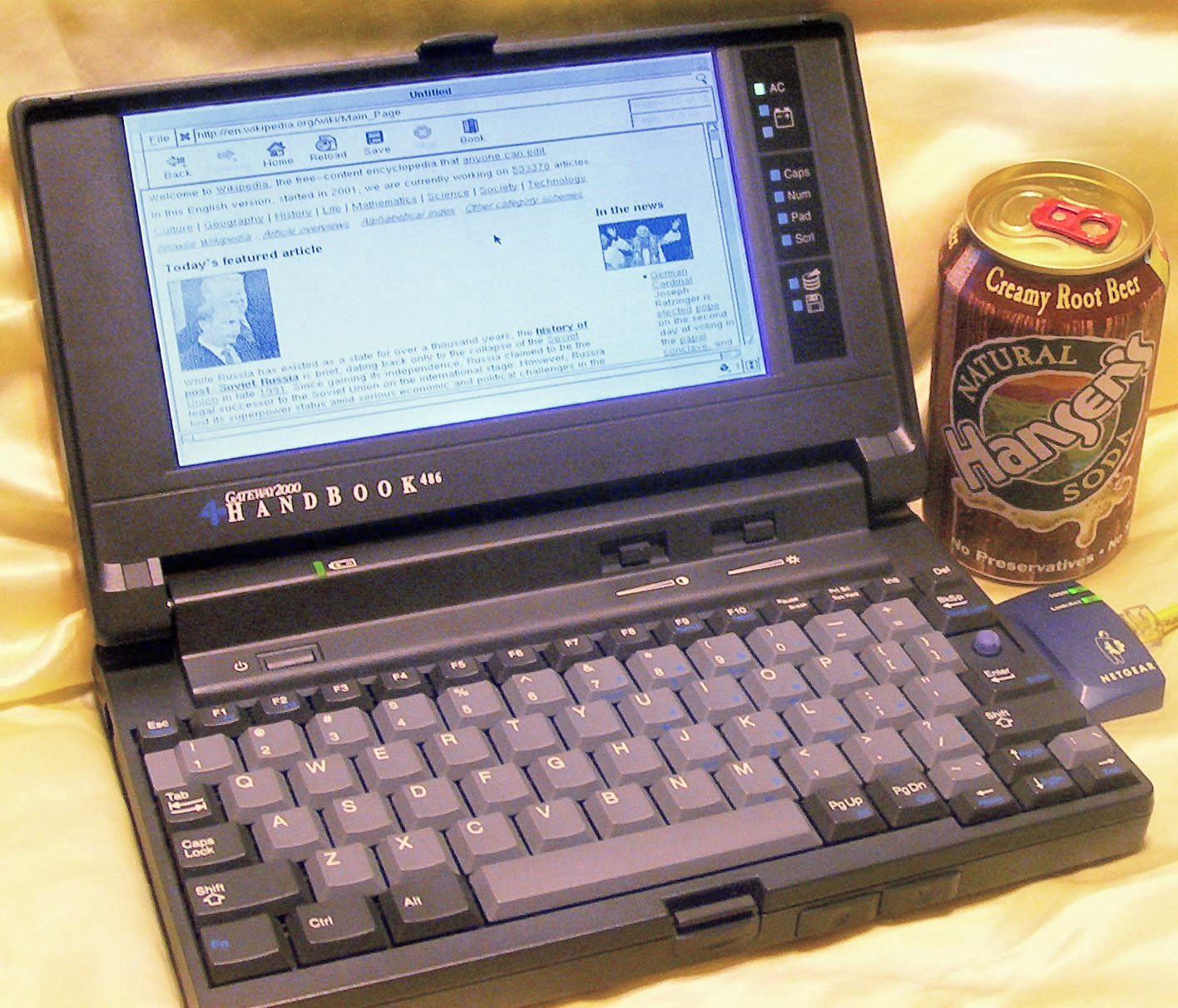
- A HandBook 486 running the Dillo web browser on Linux
- Developer: Gateway 2000; Howard Fullmer; Bob Burnett; Rick Murayama
- Manufacturer: Tottori Sanyo
- Type: Subnotebook
- Released: 1992; 34 years ago
- Lifespan: 1992–1996
- CPU: Chips and Technologies 8680 (original); Intel 486 (HandBook 486)
- Memory: 640 KB RAM stock (original); 4 MB RAM stock (HandBook 486)
- Dimensions: 9.7 by 5.9 by 1.6 inches (246 by 150 by 41 mm)
- Weight: <3 pounds (1.4 kg)

The HandBook was a very small and lightweight subnotebook originally introduced by Gateway 2000 in 1992. It quickly achieved critical acclaim and a cult-like following, especially in Japan.

It was designed by IQV and Tottori Sanyo and manufactured by Tottori Sanyo in Japan. The lead engineer on the product was Howard Fullmer and other significant contributors included Bob Burnett and Rick Murayama.

The product was only 9.7 in (250 mm) wide, 5.9 in (150 mm) deep, and 1.6 in (41 mm) high, and weighed less than 3 lb (1.4 kg). While it used a Chips and Technologies 8680 microprocessor, it was marketed as having 286-level performance. The C&T chip set included hardware emulation of the Intel 80186 processor and the HandBook used a special feature of the chip set called SuperSet whereby 80286 instructions were trapped and then emulated in software. This same feature was used to emulate the 8051 keyboard controller, serial port and numerous other I/O functions. Intel worked closely with IQV to include similar capabilities in the SL chip sets which were introduced in the mid-90s.

The HandBook had 640 KB of RAM, a 20 MB hard drive, and a monochrome blue-white CGA-compatible display. The unit could be powered by a rechargeable NiMH battery or six AA batteries in a special battery pack. The rechargeable batteries were unusual in that they are able to be charged without actually being in the laptop. A floppy disk was attached through a proprietary parallel port connector. A tremendous engineering effort went into the design of the HandBook's keyboard. It featured 17.8 mm center-to center key spacing and 2 mm travel for a firm feel.

After the success of the original Gateway HandBook, Gateway came out with a 486 model. The HandBook 486 (as it was called) was originally available as two models: A 486SX/25 and a 486DX/40 model. Gateway later on came out with HandBook 486 models utilizing a 486SX/33 or 486DX/50 processor. All of these handbooks used a grayscale 640x480 VGA display. Because of the small size of the unit, the display was distorted — what appear as circles on other displays come out as ovals on the HandBook 486.

The built-in hard disk for the HandBook 486 was usually 120 MB in size. The HandBook 486 was produced between 1993 and 1995. The HandBook 486 had 4 MB of built-in RAM, which can be expanded to 20 MB.

It was possible to install Linux or OpenBSD on these computers; the HandBook 486 is probably the earliest Linux-compatible subnotebook released. It was also possible to run the X Window System after the memory was expanded. The HandBook 486 has a PCMCIA II interface. While Modern Cardbus cards do not work with this interface, most older PCMCIA II cards (as long as they use no more than 250 mA of power) work fine. The HandBook 486 also has a pointing device similar to the IBM trackpoint located on the right hand side of the keyboard just above the enter key.

The Gateway HandBook remains one of the smallest laptops ever produced and was a precursor to Netbooks such as the Asus Eee PC, the Dell Inspiron Mini Series, and the Acer Aspire One. The Acer Aspire One is about the same size as the HandBook, and exists in a Gateway-branded form as the Gateway LT1004u.
