= Power A5000 =

The Power A5000.

The Power A5000 was a planned Amiga clone computer, announced by German DCE Computer Service GmbH and British Amiga peripherals manufacturer Power Computing Ltd. (Not to be confused with Power Computing Apple clone manufacturer). It was one of the first Amiga clone computers announced after Gateway purchased the Amiga in 1997.

The original Motorola 680x0 based system was revised in favor of the PowerPC G3 based system, since the future for the Amigas with 680x0 processors was very uncertain. In 1999, the A5000 was cancelled due to delays of hardware components and announcements of the new Amiga system Amiga Multimedia Convergence Computer (Amiga MCC) by Amiga, Inc.

== Technical information ==
=== Original specifications ===
- Motherboard: Baby AT-size 100% Amiga-compatible
- CPU: Motorola 68030/50 MHz or 68040
- Chipset: AGA
- Drives:
  - 1.44 MB floppy drive
  - 1.7 GB IDE hard drive
  - 10 - 24 speed IDE CD-ROM
- Expansion:
  - Dual IDE interface
  - 4 Zorro III slots
  - A bus slot for the addition of accelerators and MPEG card
- Additional:
  - MPEG level 1 supported
  - PC or Amiga keyboard
  - A scan doubler for use with cheap PC monitors
  - Possible addition of PowerPC interface

=== Revised specifications ===
- PowerPC G3 compatibility through Escena Brainstormer G3
- 68k emulation
- WarpUp PPC software
- A1200 accelerator slot compatible
- Flicker Fixer
- 3x Active PCI slots
- ATX motherboard
- 2x A4000-style videoslots
- Connector for Zorro II backplane

== See also ==
- Amiga Walker
- Amiga models and variants
