= Michael G. Porter =

Australian academic economist

Michael G. Porter (born 15 September 1943) is an Australian academic economist who taught at the Australian National University (Canberra) and Monash University (Melbourne). In 1979, he set up a think-tank at Monash University, the Centre of Policy Studies (CoPS) supporting freer markets in commodities, finance and foreign exchange along with researching and advocating significant market-improving regulatory reforms. As part of this process CoPS employed leading US and other international economists and industry specialists. He was also the founding director of Tasman Institute from 1990-98.

== Early life ==
Michael Glenthorne Porter attended Scotch College, South Australia, was an undergraduate economics student and then tutor at Adelaide University, 1961–64 and a PhD student at Stanford University (USA) 1965-68.

As an undergraduate, he was Treasurer of the Student's Representative Council 1962-63, and founding Treasurer of the ALP Club 1963, which replaced the Labour Club. He was appointed to the three-person economics committee of national Young Labor during the reform-oriented Dunstan and Whitlam period. He was a founding organiser of what became the Adelaide branch of the Australian Overseas Student Travel Service, and its 60 selected students 3-month inaugural visit to India in 1962-63. The pioneer group travelled by 3rd class rail and hitch-hiking on trucks across village India. There were family homestays in major capitals. Porter was one of 10 students invited to meet with Prime Minister Jawaharlal Nehru in the Lok Sabha of the Indian Parliament. He was an Adelaide delegate to the annual National Union Australian University Students meetings.

=== Initial post graduate activity ===
After finishing his PhD course work at Stanford University in Palo Alto, California in 1968, he was an assistant professor at Simon Fraser Universities (Canada) 1968-70 and visiting research scholar at the University of Essex, UK on a Canada Council Fellowship in 1969-70, while finishing the thesis component of the Stanford PhD. His PhD research thesis was on exchange rate dynamics, both short and long run, as reflected in the relative intertemporal term structure of national government bond interest rates. In the spirit of Irving Fisher, it was a new way of addressing the implications of high capital mobility on monetary autonomy and inflation and economic management at the national level. The Canadian currency float in the 1950s was a useful case study, but the subsequent float of the German Deutsche Mark (DM) in 1971 became his policy focus when he later moved to the Research and policy Department of the International Monetary Fund in Washington DC 1970-72. He later took similar jobs on leave from the IMF, with the Reserve Bank of Australia in 1972-73 and the Department of Prime Minister and Cabinet (Priorities Review Staff) 1973-75.

== Career ==
1970-73 - International Monetary Fund and Central Banking - Australia and Germany

His first post-academic job after completing PhD course work at Stanford University and two years in universities in Canada and the UK, was with the International Monetary Fund (Research Department, Wash. DC, 1970). In the IMF Research Department, he played a lead role in modelling the factors and reasons why Germany, for example, needed to and eventually did float the DM currency in March 1973. This was a pioneering move in the IMF "Bretton Woods" context, given the international inflation emerging from the US with its "unfinanced" Vietnam war. The shackles of politically fixed exchange rates and direct trade and capital controls post the Bretton Woods agreements underpinning the IMF were being challenged, now including within the IMF.

Porter's main work within the IMF and some central banks, was much inspired by Stanford's Ronald McKinnon's and Nobel Laureate Robert Mundell for theories of internal and external balance under fixed versus floating exchange rate. Given high international capital mobility between the German Deutsche Mark (DM) and other foreign currencies, floating with consistent fiscal policies, became understood as a probable but not yet quantified key means to restore control of the money supply and resist importing inflation. This monetary pressure came from US and global capital markets in the context of the LBJ deficit-funded Vietnam War.

The contribution of Porter's internal arguments and then documents and published IMF Staff Paper's model, was to successfully quantify behavioural links to IMF satisfaction, Ãla McKinnon and Mundell, between attempts at independent monetary policy and induced offsetting capital movements. These models and their econometric estimation accurately predict and predicted net international capital movements in relation to Germany and showed that with fixed exchange rates independent anti-inflationary policy would not work at all. There would be 100% offset to monetary restriction through induced net international capital inflows.

Post the consequences of early 1920s hyperinflation, Germany was not in 1970 a country to tolerate domestic or imported inflation and so had to float, Porter argued within the IMF and at conferences, against powerful official and academic opposition . The Deutsche Bundesbank eventually agreed in public, not least at a 1972 international monetary conference in Konstanz at which Porter presented.

Following a challenge from a leading American monetary economist, Karl Brunner, the session featured a phone call from the Governor of the Fed to the President of the Deutsche Bundesbank on the point that Germany had to float the DM in order to retain independent control of the German base money supply, with both central bankers confirming their agreement with the Kouri-Porter paper.. And there were many countries in Germany's situation in the early 1970s - even Australia - and floating currencies followed over the next decade or so.

In 1972 Porter published at the IMF and later on 1974 with Pentti Kouri (also of the IMF and later MIT, Stanford, Yale and controversially, Finland) the first successful predictive general equilibrium portfolio econometric model of how international capital movements offset the workings of attempts at independent monetary policy applied to four differing economies - Germany, Italy, Canada and Australia. The extent of offset was shown to vary significantly across these different currency areas, creating a reason to float within a market-based foreign exchange system. Versions of these papers were presented at many conferences in Europe, North America and Australia and published in IMF Staff Papers 1971 and The Journal of Political Economy, March 1972 and later applied in Australia and many other economies.

=== Reserve Bank of Australia ===
After implementation of the German financial reforms Porter was invited to be a Senior Adviser at The Reserve Bank of Australia, International Department, 1972–73, as Australia battled the same global imported inflation given official exchange rate rigidity that weakened independent monetary policy in open economies. He prepared RBA papers for the international Committee of 20 meetings on related monetary and capital market reform.

=== 1973-75 Department of Prime Minister and Cabinet ===
Extending leave from the IMF, post a pneumonectomy in Washington DC. and related health issues, and a period at the RBA, the election of the Whitlam Labor government in Dec 1972, created a role for Porter as a founding senior economic adviser with The Priorities Review Staff (PRS) of the new Prime Minister of Australia. Austin Holmes, former Chief Economist of the RBA was made founding Director of the PRS, and Porter became Senior Adviser from the start.

A key part of the PRS assignment, with a staff rising to 20, was development of economic and social reform policy options, commentary on most economically important Cabinet submissions by all Ministers and preparation of comment on the long term forward estimates of potential expenditure and revenue and associated policies. This involved advising Ministers via the PM as to consequences of alternative economic and financing strategies, in the context of the Labor government having been out of office for 23 years.

Despite the Whitlam government's fiscal foibles and failures, due in part to an impatient parliamentary "back bench", the social reforms were substantial, e.g. in health, welfare and education, and beneficial economic trade and financial reform pressures set in. Australia rose to the top of league growth tables and international economic performance in the decades ahead. Whereas blue collar workers real incomes in the USA have been stagnant over three most recent decades their Australian counterparts have doubled their real incomes within the same three decades, and in a fairly equitable and sustainable society.

There was however resulting pressure after 23 years out, for what became an excessive and inflationary pace of new expenditures to meet pent up and reformist social and political demands in the elected base. Measures agreed by the reforming Whitlam government included dramatic tariff cuts and anti-protectionist regulatory changes, and what became new comprehensive universal Medicare and insurance reforms integrated with tax reforms. Some reforms were frequently contested with Treasury including financial liberalisation supported by the Reserve Bank (eg floating), but which was eventually implemented by the Hawke-Keating government 1983.

=== 1975 -1989, The Australian National University and Monash University ===
In 1975, as the Whitlam government battled the consequences of failure to implement fiscal rectitude, Porter accepted a part time senior lectureship at the ANU, which briefly became full time in 1976. However, Monash University concurrently offered Porter a tenured chair which he accepted later in 1975 and moved to Monash in mid 1976.

His Monash days as a teaching professor were cut short with acceptance of the Irving Fisher Chair, Yale University in 1978-79 followed by a brief Visiting Professorship at "The Fed", in the International Department of the Federal Reserve System in Washington DC. The Fed is the USA Central Bank, and the banker to most of the world's central banks' foreign currency reserves.

=== Think-tanks in Australia ===
In 1990, Porter set up his second economic think-tank outside the University.

=== Tasman Institute ===
At the end of 1989, following an end to six years of competitively earned and generous Commonwealth funding for CoPS, and a politically blocked attempt to fund a not-for-profit Tasman University, Michael and some former CoPS colleagues left Monash University and raised funds from the private sector to form The Tasman Institute and an associated economic consultancy which became Tasman Asia Pacific. The Chairman of the new Tasman Institute and consultancy was Baillieu Myer AC, who had also been appointed by the Prime Minister to the earlier 1982 Centres of Excellence Committee of the Commonwealth Government. The Deputy Chairman of Tasman Institute was Sir Roger Douglas, former Minister of Finance in the New Zealand Government, and in whose policy reform discussions Michael, CoPS and staff of New Zealand Treasury had in many cases been actively involved. Several outstanding officers from New Zealand Treasury had also been seconded to CoPS in the mid 1980s. The work of CoPS thus continued in the Tasman entities absent Commonwealth funding, with existing and new research staff and projects targeted on key priorities in economic reform in Australia, New Zealand and Asia in particular.

The published Australian independent reform agendas that emerged from the new Tasman Institute embracing earlier CoPS work included Reform of State-Owned Enterprises in Victoria, Energy Pricing Issues in Victoria, National Priorities Project, (two volumes, Spending and Taxing I, Spending and Taxing II), Markets and Environment, New Strategies for Transport in Victoria. These were some of the key documents assembled for Project Victoria, preceding the 1992 election. This Project was jointly organised from 1990 with the Institute of Public Affairs. These documents and associated public conferences and meetings were widely publicised in the media and were influential in many forums in the 1980s.

The state enterprise reform work, financial reform advice and other proposed infrastructure innovation while originally focused on Victoria, New Zealand and Australia, a focus later in the 1990s was on many parts of Asia, with funded projects of the World Bank, The Asian Development Bank and AusAID. Michael had become a frequent adviser to New Zealand Reserve Bank and Treasury and particularly Finance Minister Sir Roger Douglas, who on retirement from Cabinet became Deputy Chairman of Tasman Institute and Tasman Asia Pacific under Porter as Executive Director.

Building on the new 1990s pro-reform climate regarding infrastructure investment, and well-structured regulatory reforms and public-private partnerships, there was a climate for similar reforms overseas, and Tasman Asia Pacific won work in a dozen or more countries in Asia and the Pacific. then a dozen Asian countries with World Bank, ADB, and AusAID competitive funding received totalling in excess of $20 million via CoPS Monash and Tasman Institute and the Tasman Asia Pacific economics consultancy. Subsequently he was Research and Policy National Director with the Committee for Economic Development of Australia, with a focus including telecommunications and broadband, NBN, utilities reform general economic management and taxation.

The proposed Tasman University, while legally registered in Auckland, NZ, was blocked from Victorian and Australian registration by the Commonwealth Minister of Education John Dawkins and the Victorian Labor government. Though generously backed by international scholars who were keen to join in joint appointments, international and domestic business and community leaders and financiers and with the support of Baillieu Myer AC, Hugh Morgan AC, Richard Pratt, Rupert Murdoch and many others. Some of the most enthusiastic supporters were the Labour Prime Minister David Lange.

== Notable publications ==
- Joint Editors; M. G Porter with P. Ackroyd, A Moran, A Chisholm, Environmental Resources and the Market-Place, Allen & Unwin (1991)
- Joint Editors; M. G Porter with A. Moran and A. Chisholm, Markets, Resources and the Environment, Allen & Unwin, (1991).
- Joint Editors M. G Porter with J.W. Freebairn and C. Walsh, Savings and Productivity: Incentives for the 1990s, Allen & Unwin (1989).
- Joint Editors M. G Porter with J.W. Freebairn and C. Walsh, Spending and Taxing II: Taking Stock, Allen & Unwin (1988).
- Joint Editors M. G Porter with J.W. Freebairn and C. Walsh, Spending and Taxing: Australian Reform Options, Allen & Unwin (1987).
- Joint Editors; M. G Porter with L.H. Cook, The Role of Minerals and Energy in the Australian Economy, Allen & Unwin (1984).
- M. G. Porter, Editor, The Australian Monetary System in the 1970's, Monash University, 1978, Published by the Economic Society of Australia and NZ as a supplementary issue of the Economic Record, 1978.
- Social Democratic Governments: the Failure of Economic Controls, in Ranson (ed.), Blast, Budge or Bypass: Towards a Social Democratic Australia, Academy of the Social Sciences in Australia (1984)
- Labour of Liberalization, in J.A. Scutt (ed.), Poor Nation of the Pacific Australia's Future, Allen and Unwin, Sydney, 1985.
- Turner, Andrea; Sahin, Oz; Giurco, Damien; Stewart, Rodney; Porter, Michael (November 2016). "The potential role of desalination in managing flood risks from dam overflows: the case of Sydney, Australia". Journal of Cleaner Production. 135: 342–355. doi:10.1016/j.jclepro.2016.05.128. hdl:10072/142159.
- Scarborough, Helen; Sahin, Oz; Porter, Michael; Stewart, Rodney (February 2015). "Long-term water supply planning in an Australian coastal city: Dams or desalination?". Desalination. 358: 61–68. Bibcode:2015Desal.358...61S. doi:10.1016/j.desal.2014.12.013. hdl:10072/69190.
- Porter, Michael G.; Downie, David; Scarborough, Helen; Sahin, Oz; Stewart, Rodney A. (28 August 2015). "Drought and Desalination: Melbourne water supply and development choices in the twenty-first century". Desalination and Water Treatment. 55 (9): 2278–2295. Bibcode:2015DWatT..55.2278P. doi:10.1080/19443994.2014.959743. hdl:10072/65114.
- Sahin, Oz; Stewart, Rodney A.; Porter, Michael G. (February 2015). "Water security through scarcity pricing and reverse osmosis: a system dynamics approach". Journal of Cleaner Production. 88: 160–171. doi:10.1016/j.jclepro.2014.05.009. hdl:10072/61362.
- Michael G Porter (Editor and lead contributor), "Growth 60: Australia's Broadband Future - Four doors to greater competition, Committee for Economic Development of Australia, December 2008. https://www.ceda.com.au/ResearchAndPolicies/Research/Technology-Innovation/Growth-60-Australia-s-Broadband-Future-Four-doors
- Tax Reform Proposal from the Centre of Policy Studies, (with J. Cox and G. Bascand). Australian Tax Forum, Volume 2, Number 3, Spring 1985.
- Securing Water Supply in Adelaide over the Next Century Balancing Desalinated and Murray-Darling Basin Water, European Water Resources Association (EWRA) 9th International Conference. European Water Resources Association: Istanbul, Turkey. https://econpapers.repec.org/paper/dkneconwp/eco_5f2015_5f3.htm
- Infrastructure in Australia, The Role of Private Ownership, Government Regulation and Political Control, Bureau of Industry Economics Infrastructure Conference, Canberra, Australia, June, 1992.
