= Gateway Solo =

Series of laptop computers

Solo

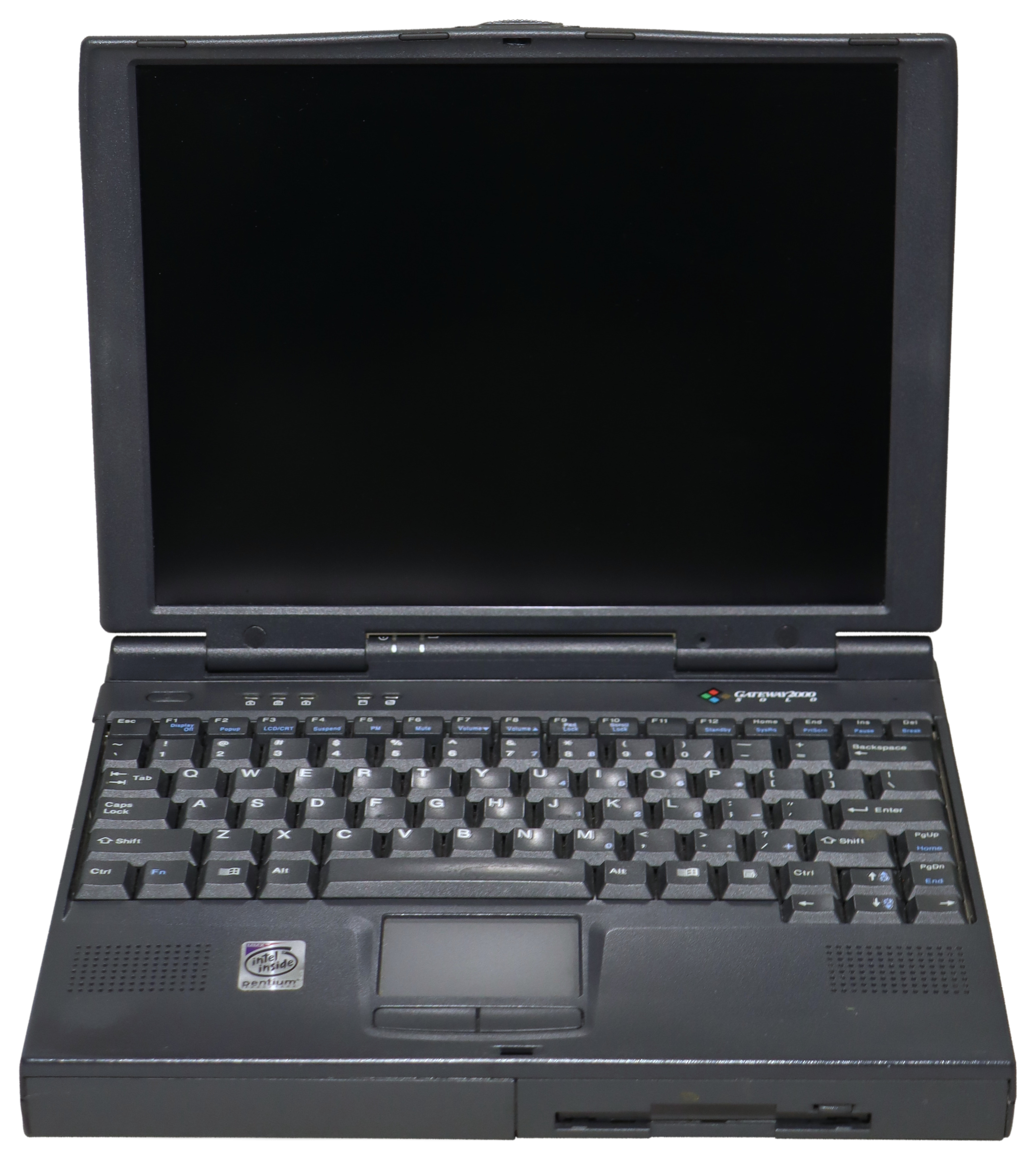
- Solo 2200
- Developer: Gateway, Inc. (formerly Gateway 2000); Sanyo (early models)
- Manufacturer: Sanyo (early models)
- Type: Laptop
- Released: September 1995
- Lifespan: 1995–2003
- Discontinued: December 2002
- CPU: Pentium; Pentium II; Pentium III; Celeron

The Solo was a line of laptop computers sold by Gateway, Inc. (originally Gateway 2000), from 1995 to 2003. All models in the range were equipped with Intel x86 processors and came preinstalled with the Windows operating system.

== History ==
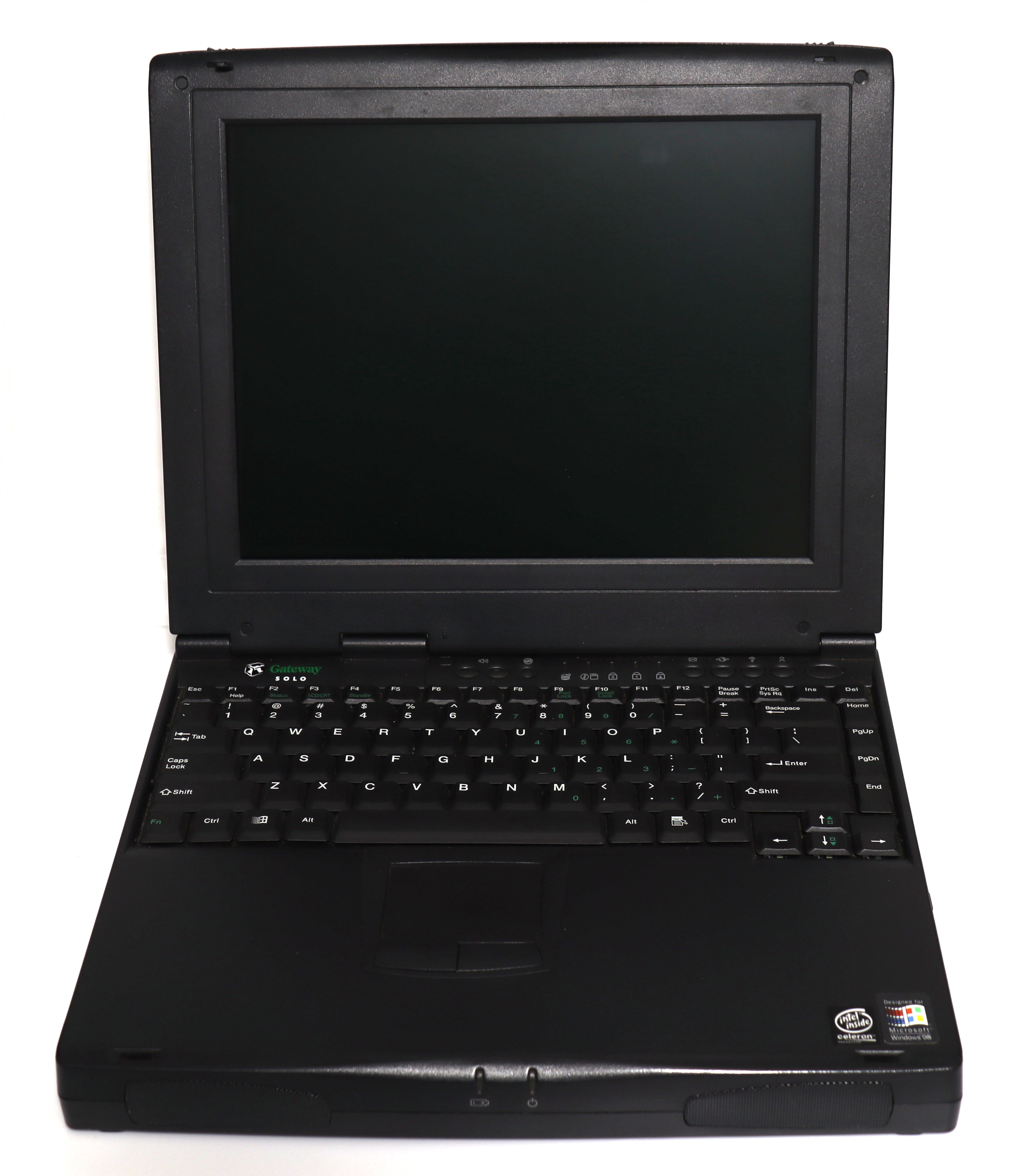
Solo 2150

Gateway unveiled the Solo line of laptops on August 15, 1995, shortly before Microsoft's Windows 95 operating system became generally available for sale on August 24, 1995. Initial entries in the Solo line-up were manufactured on an OEM basis by the Japanese company Sanyo. The Solo was the first laptop to have a Windows key and a Menu key, which respectively activate the Start menu and context menus on Windows (the Start menu first appeared in Windows 95). Gateway worked closely with Microsoft on development of the Solo to make it fully optimized with Windows 95, which was a nearly top-down redesign of Microsoft's previous Windows 3.1x operating systems. The Solo replaced Gateway's earlier ColorBook and Liberty line of laptops and were the first of the company's laptops to feature Intel's x86-based Pentium processor, for which Windows 95 was optimized during its development.

The Solo was released to retailers and corporate resellers in September 1995. The first two models—the V75 and the S90—came with Pentium processors clocked at 75 MHz and 90 MHz respectively. Both Solos were multimedia-oriented and came with a Sound Blaster–compatible sound chip and removable CD-ROM drives bays as standard; Gateway later made the CD-ROM drives an optional add-on to reduce cost at the entry level. The company marketed the Solo at the cost-conscious businessperson and positioned it as a budget version of the more upscale IBM ThinkPad and Toshiba Satellite lines of laptops.

Later entries in the Solo line featured the Pentium II, Pentium III's, and various P6-based Celerons. The Solo line was retired in December 2002. Gateway sold refurbished units of the Solo line on their website until 2003.

== Models ==
Gateway Solo models
Model	Release date	Processor	Clock speed (MHz)	Graphics	LCD technology	LCD size (in.)	LCD resolution	Stock RAM (max., in MB)	Storage (HDD)	Audio	Operating System	Notes/ref(s).
V75	September 1995	Intel Pentium	75		Color TFT	10.4	640×480	8 (40)	540 MB			
S90	September 1995	Intel Pentium	90		Color TFT	10.4	800×600	16 (40)	720 MB			
2100	June 1996	Intel Pentium	100 or 120 or 133	Cirrus Logic GD7548	Color TFT	11.3; 12.1	800×600	16 + 8 Onboard (72)	540 MB or 810 MB or 1.3 GB	ESS AudioDrive 1888 with built-in stereo speakers and microphone	Windows 95	
2200	January 1997	Intel Pentium MMX	120 or 133 or 150 or 166	Chips & Technologies 65554	Color TFT	12.1	800×600	16 (80)	2 GB	ESS AudioDrive 1878 with built-in stereo speakers and microphone		
9100	May 1997	Intel Pentium MMX	150 or 166	Chips & Technologies 65554; Trident Cyber9397	Color TFT	13.3	800×600	48 (164)	3 GB	Yamaha OPL-SA3 with built-in stereo speakers and microphone		
2300	July 1997	Intel Pentium MMX	150 or 166 or 200 or 233	NeoMagic MagicGraph 128ZV (NM2093); NeoMagic MagicGraph 128XD (NM2160/NMG4)	Color TFT	12.1	800×600	32 (192)	2 GB	Yamaha YM715 with built-in stereo speakers and microphone		
5100	January 1998	Intel Pentium MMX	166 or 200 or 233 or 266	Chips & Technologies 65555	Color TFT	14.1	1024×768	16 (144)	2 GB or 3 GB or 4.2 GB	ESS AudioDrive 1879 with built-in stereo speakers and microphone		
2500	May 1998	Intel Pentium MMX or Mobile Pentium II or Celeron	233 (Pentium MMX); 233 or 266 or 300 or 333 or 366 (Pentium II); 266 or 300 (Celeron)		Color TFT	12.1 (LS); 13.3 (XL)	800×600 (LS); 1024×768 (XL)	64 (288)	3 GB or 4.2 GB			
5150	August 1998	Intel Mobile Pentium II	233 or 266 or 300 or 333 or 366	NeoMagic MagicMedia 256AV (NM2200)	Color TFT	14.1	1024×768	32 (288)	2 GB or 4 GB or 6.4 GB			
9150	April 1999	Intel Mobile Pentium II	300 or 333 or 366		Color TFT	15.1	1024×768	(384)	14 GB (up to)			
3300	May 2000	Intel Mobile Pentium III	500		Color TFT	12.1	1024×768	64 (128)	6 GB or 12 GB			
9300	August 1999	Intel Mobile Pentium III	400	ATI Rage Mobility-P	Color TFT	15.1	1024×768	128	10 GB			
2150	October 1999	Intel Celeron or Mobile Pentium III	400 (Celeron); 450 (Pentium III)		Color TFT	12.1; 14.1	800×600; 1024×768	32	6 GB			
2550	October 1999	Intel Celeron or Mobile Pentium II or Mobile Pentium III	Various; 600 or 650 (Pentium III)		Color TFT	15.7	1280×1024	(288)	4–18 GB			
3350	September 2000	Intel Celeron or Pentium III-M	500 (Celeron); 600 (Pentium III)		Color TFT	12.1	1024×768	64 (256)	6–20 GB			
5300	August 2000	Intel Celeron or Pentium III-M	500–600 (Celeron); 700 (Pentium III)		Color TFT	12.1	1024×768	64 (512)	6–20 GB			
1150	August 2000	Intel Celeron	500 or 550		Color TFT	12.1	1024×768	32 (512)	5 GB or 6 GB			
9500	March 2001	Intel Pentium III-M	700–1000		Color TFT	15.1; 15.7 (XL Deluxe)	1280×1024	256 (512)	6 GB or 10 GB			
1200	July 2001	Intel Celeron	800	S3 Savage4	Color TFT	12.1	1024×768	64 (192)	10 GB	Conexant with built-in stereo speakers		
3450	July 2001	Intel Mobile Pentium III	750		Color TFT	12.1	1024×768	192 (192)	10 GB			
9550	August 2001	Intel Mobile Pentium III	933 or 1000 or 1130		Color TFT	15.7	1280×1024	128 (512)	10 GB or 20 GB or 30 GB			
1400	December 2001	Intel Celeron	850		Color TFT	14.1	1024×768	128 (512)	10 GB			
5350	December 2001	Intel Pentium III-M	733–1000	Intel 830MG	Color TFT	14.1	1024×768	256 (512)	20	ESS Allegro-1 (ES1988) with built-in stereo speakers and microphone		
1450	April 2002	Intel Celeron	1200		Color TFT	14.1; 15.1	1024×768 (14.1); 1280×1024 (15.1)	128 (512)	20 GB			
