= Pentti Kouri =

Finnish economist (1949–2009)

Pentti Juha Kalervo Kouri (12 February 1949 – 22 January 2009) was a Finnish economist and venture capitalist. He was born in Kemijärvi.

== Education and career ==
Kouri was the first Finn to get a scholarship to the United World College of the Atlantic. After graduating from there, he got his master's degree in economics from the University of Helsinki in 1970. In that same year, when he was 21 years old, he was hired by the International Monetary Fund. It was at IMF's research organization where Kouri first met Michael G. Porter, an Australian economist, with whom he later developed the Kouri-Porter model.

Kouri received his PhD in Economics from MIT in 1974. He has served as a professor of economics at Stanford, Yale, Helsinki, and New York City universities.

Later he became known as a venture capitalist. For instance, he managed George Soros's investments to Finland. Today, he is remembered for his participation in the controversial "Kouri-deals" in the late 1980s. In the "Kouri-deals", a group of investors including Kouri collaborated to buy a majority of the two largest banks of Finland, mostly with borrowed money, causing a political outcry.

== Personal life ==
Kouri was married to Elly O. Kouri and divorced in 1995. Pentti Kouri died in January 2009 in Los Angeles. Until his death, he sat on the Board of Trustees of Dia Art Foundation.

In May 2001, the Kouri Capital group led by Kouri and George Soros was declared bankrupt.

== Companies related to Kouri ==
- Nokia: Kouri was a shareholder and member of the board of directors.
- Invisible hand.
- Espial
- Amiga, Inc.: Kouri was the chairman of the board.
- Simply TV Inc.: Kouri was a shareholder and chairman of the board.
- hakia, Inc.: Kouri was a shareholder and member of the board of directors.
- Askar Capital: Kouri was a member of the advisory board.
- Ztango: Kouri was a co-founder and an investor. The company was acquired by WiderThan in 2004.

== Sources ==
- Kouri, Pentti (1996). Suomen omistaja ja muut elämäni roolit. Otava (trans. of title: Owner of Finland and other roles of my life).
- Saukkomaa, Harri (1991). Kuka tarvitsi Pentti Kouria? Otava (trans. of title: Who needed Pentti Kouri?).
