= Amiga Walker =

The Amiga Walker (1996).

The Amiga Walker, sometimes incorrectly known as the Mind Walker, is a prototype of an Amiga computer developed and shown by Amiga Technologies, a subsidiary of Escom, in late 1995/early 1996. Walker was planned as a replacement for the A1200 with a faster CPU, better expansion capabilities, and a built-in CD-ROM. The Walker was never released; Escom and Amiga Technologies went bankrupt, and only two (three) prototypes were made.

The case is unique and radically different from computers before it. The intention was also to make the motherboard available without the case so users could put it into a standard PC case. There were a number of other potential case designs of different sizes, the Walker motherboard could fit all of them; this allowed for expandability tailored to the user's requirements.

When the Walker was announced, it was the subject of much discussion (and ridicule) within the Amiga user community, centering on the unconventional case design.

== Technical information ==
=== Specifications ===
The Amiga Walker motherboard.

- CPU:
  - Motorola 68030/33 MHz (in the prototype version)
  - Motorola 68030/40 MHz (compared to 68020/14 MHz in A1200)
- Chipset: AGA
- Memory:
  - 1 MB Kickstart ROM (compared to 512 kB in the original Amiga 1200)
  - 2 MB Chip RAM
  - 4 MB Fast RAM (only in the production version)
- Drives:
  - internal CD-ROM
  - 1.44 MB internal floppy drive
- Realtime clock onboard
- Additional:
  - Amiga keyboard

== See also ==
- Power A5000
- Amiga models and variants
