= Hakia =

Former Internet search engine

hakia
- Website type: Web search engine
- Website: www.Hakia.com at the Wayback Machine (archived May 11, 2004)
- Launched: March 2004; 22 years ago
- Current status: Inactive

hakia was an Internet search engine. Launched in March 2004 and based in New York City, hakia attempted to pioneer a semantic search engine in contrast to keyword search engines that were established at that time. The search engine ceased operations in 2014. Since 2015 the domain has been owned by HughesNet.

Hakia was founded by Rıza Can Berkan and Pentti Kouri

The company invented QDEXing technology, an infrastructure to indexing that uses "SemanticRank" algorithm, using ontological semantics, fuzzy logic, computational linguistics, and mathematics. In 2008, hakia added several sub-categories for search engine hits, such as "credible sites" for information by trusted websites, "news", "images" and "meet others", a feature that let users find forums and groups for related search items.

== See also ==
- List of search engines
