= Osborne (computer retailer) =

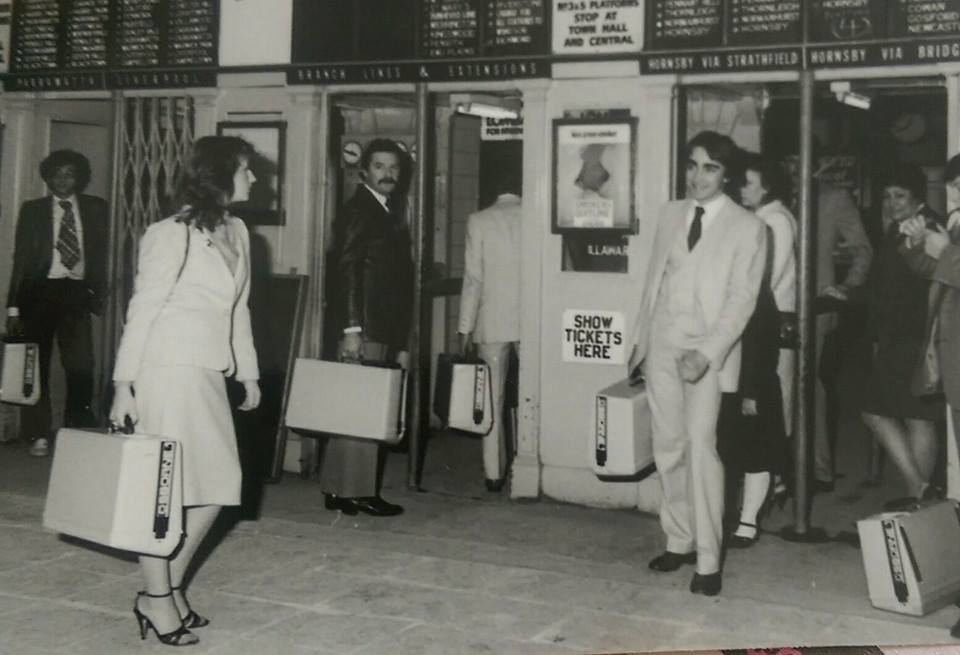
The 1st sign of portable computers on the streets of Sydney in 1982

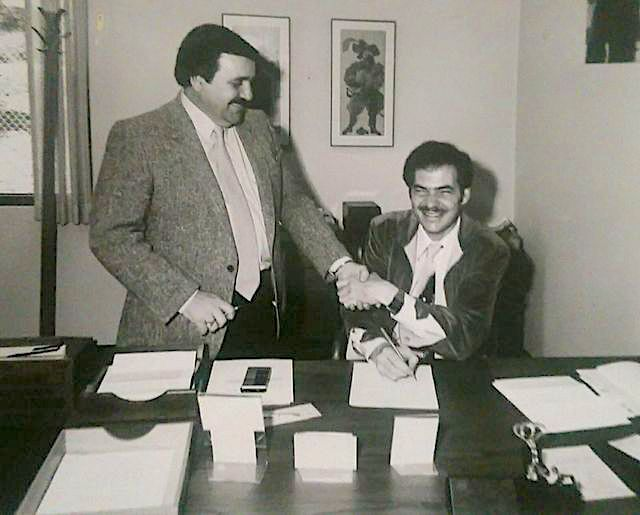
Tom Cooper signs with Adam Osborne for Australian exclusive.

Osborne was the name of one of the largest and most successful computer wholesalers and resellers in Australia. Osborne Corporation in Australia was originally registered by President Computers founded by Tom Cooper, the name was transferred back to the US HQ founder Adam Osborne and his Osborne Computer Corporation, as a good will gesture by Cooper in the early stages of a highly successful launch of the Osborne 1 across the Australian marketplace. Adam Osborne at this time visited Sydney Australia at the invitation of Cooper to witness first hand the phenomenal success the Osborne 1 was experiencing in the Australian market.

The Agency would in time would change hands to land with Stanley Falinsky as the final Australian distributor. The famous and original Osborne 1 "luggable" computer featuring a Z-80 processor and running CP/M as the operating system. When Osborne Corporation USA collapsed changes in the Australian business entity occurred whereas Falinsky's company retained the Osborne Company name transitioning into IBM PC compatibles in the mid-1980s and had great success with both business and government clients.

A number of entities were involved in the complex trading relationship of the brand in Australia. A search of the ASIC names database return 28 entries for "Osborne Computers". Telnet pty Ltd, Peak Pacific, Computer Manufacturing Services Pty Ltd, System Support Services Pty Ltd, Osborne Computers (UK) Ltd, Osborne Computers (NZ) are a few of the other related entities at the time.

As cited, the fact remains that in 1982, Osborne Corporation was originally represented in Australia exclusively by President Computers Pty Ltd headed by Tom Cooper, a Captain of Industry in the emerging Australian PC era. With outstanding success of Osborne 1 sales in Australia, President Computers was lauded at the time by Osborne Corp USA as the largest global distributor of Osborne I luggable computers outside of Computerland USA. However with success, Osborne's visiting CFO had his own sights on the Australian marketplace and convinced Adam Osborne to split the Agency much to Cooper's objection. This move saw President Computers equally divide its current Dealership arrangement when Osborne Corporation setup to hold half the dealership Agency locally. Upon this decision President Computers then exclusively signed on Osborne's luggable rival the US Del Mar CA manufactured Kaypro Computer produced by Non Liner Systems which boasted a larger format inbuilt screen.

Cooper who held a strong relationship with Adam Osborne also was privy to the early view of the new Osborne II model, sighting warehouses full of the first model, Cooper cautioned Osborne that the Osborne II should only be announced once clearance of the original Osborne 1 stock holdings had been depleted, ultimately dismissing such advice contributed to Osborne Corporations demise and Chapter 11 filing in September 1983, whereas Osborne Corporation in Australia was then restructured and independently moved towards the PC sector but retained use of the Osborne product brand. By this time President Computers also had successfully enjoyed strong success with Kaypro luggable computer sales had itself moved into the PC Sector under their own private label brand with Cooper's President Computer PC Assembly plant officially opened on the Gold Coast Technology Park, 1 Computer Street, Labrador Queensland in 1986 by Minister for Industry, Small Business and Technology of Queensland for Industry and Innovation Hon. Mike Ahern.

Around the time of the US collapse Osborne Australia appointed John Linton (now deceased) as the new CEO of a combined Osborne Australia entity was determined to double their already substantial market share, largely by massive discounting without reducing the traditional good quality of an Osborne machine. The marketing push was financed by demanding that customers place a 100% deposit and then wait six weeks before picking up their new system, and by buying components on ever more generous credit terms from major suppliers like Micronics and Seagate. For about six months the new policy was remarkably effective: Osborne sales boomed and competitors were unable to match their prices. Osborne were selling well below cost, but their retail losses were made up for by currency fluctuations, in particular the steadily rising value of the Australian dollar against the United States dollar.

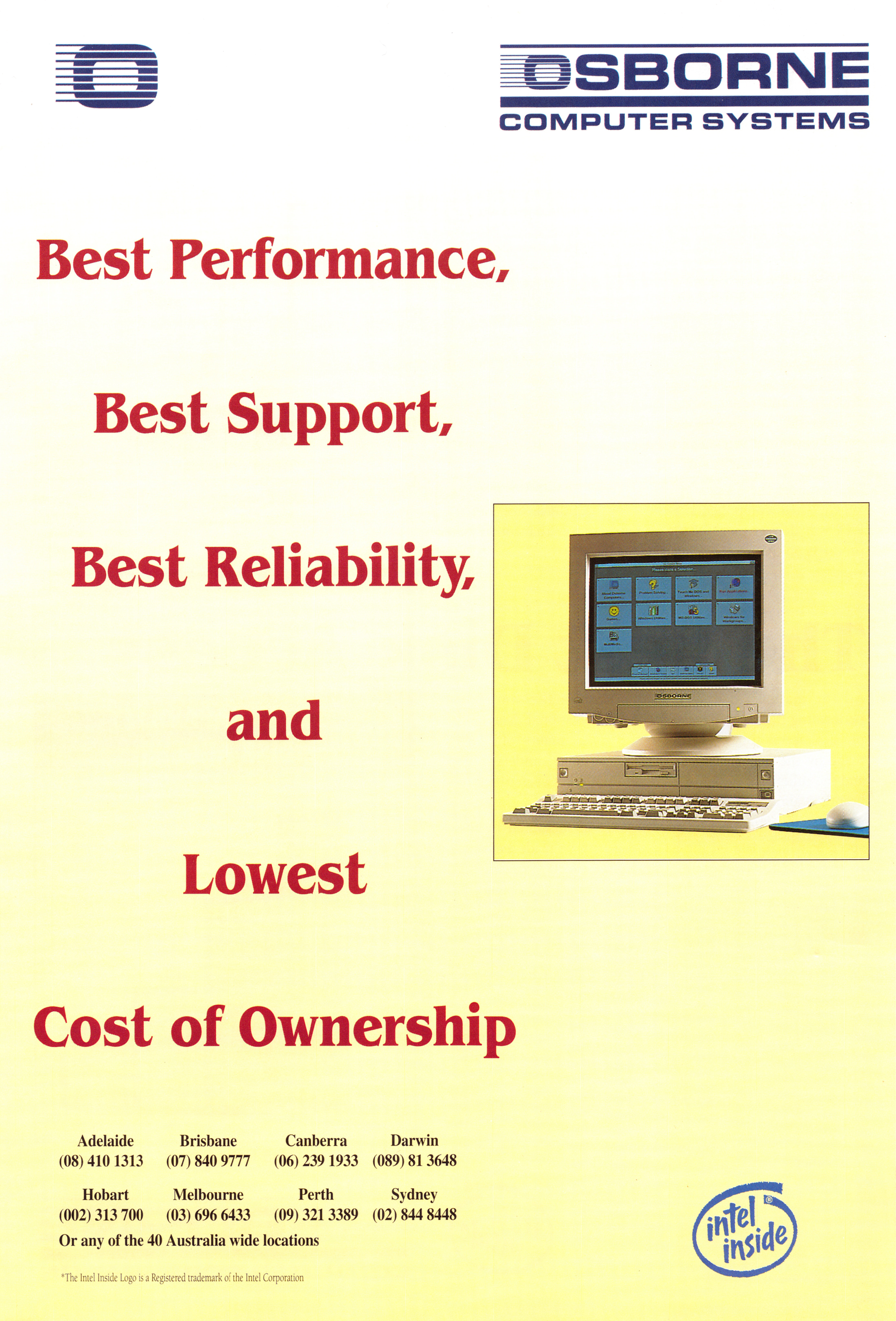
A sales brochure from 1994 highlights Osborne's position to consumers as Best "Performance, Best Support, Best Reliability, and Lowest Cost of Ownership".

Inevitably, the currency movement swung back the other way eventually, and Osborne were placed on credit hold by several of their major suppliers: unable to secure more components until at least some of the previous shipments had been paid for, and unable to ship the promised new computers to the many customers who had long since paid in full for them, Osborne went into Voluntary Administration on 25 June 1995. The notification was passed to the company's employees on 26 June 1995.

Star Dean-Willcocks were appointed Administrators to the company in June 1995, resulting in the sale of the business assets to Gateway 2000 computer company Gateway. As a result of the sale employees received all entitlements and customers who had pre-paid for computers received a new computer from the new Osborne-Gateway company. Some employees were transitioned to Osborne Gateway 2000 organisation

In the course of the Voluntary Administration new legal references were created in regards to the ownership of prepaid customer goods in Osborne Computer Corp Pty Ltd v Airroad Distribution Pty Ltd 13 ACLC 1129, 17 ASCR 614

Relaunched at the PC96 show as Osborne Gateway 2000, the company later traded as Gateway 2000 Australia for several years, but were unable to recover Osborne's former dominant position and were unsuccessful in the Australian market. Gateway withdrew from Australia in August 2001.

The trading entity continues to be registered as an Australian company ACN 003 677 272
