= Gateway, Inc. =

Former American computer hardware company

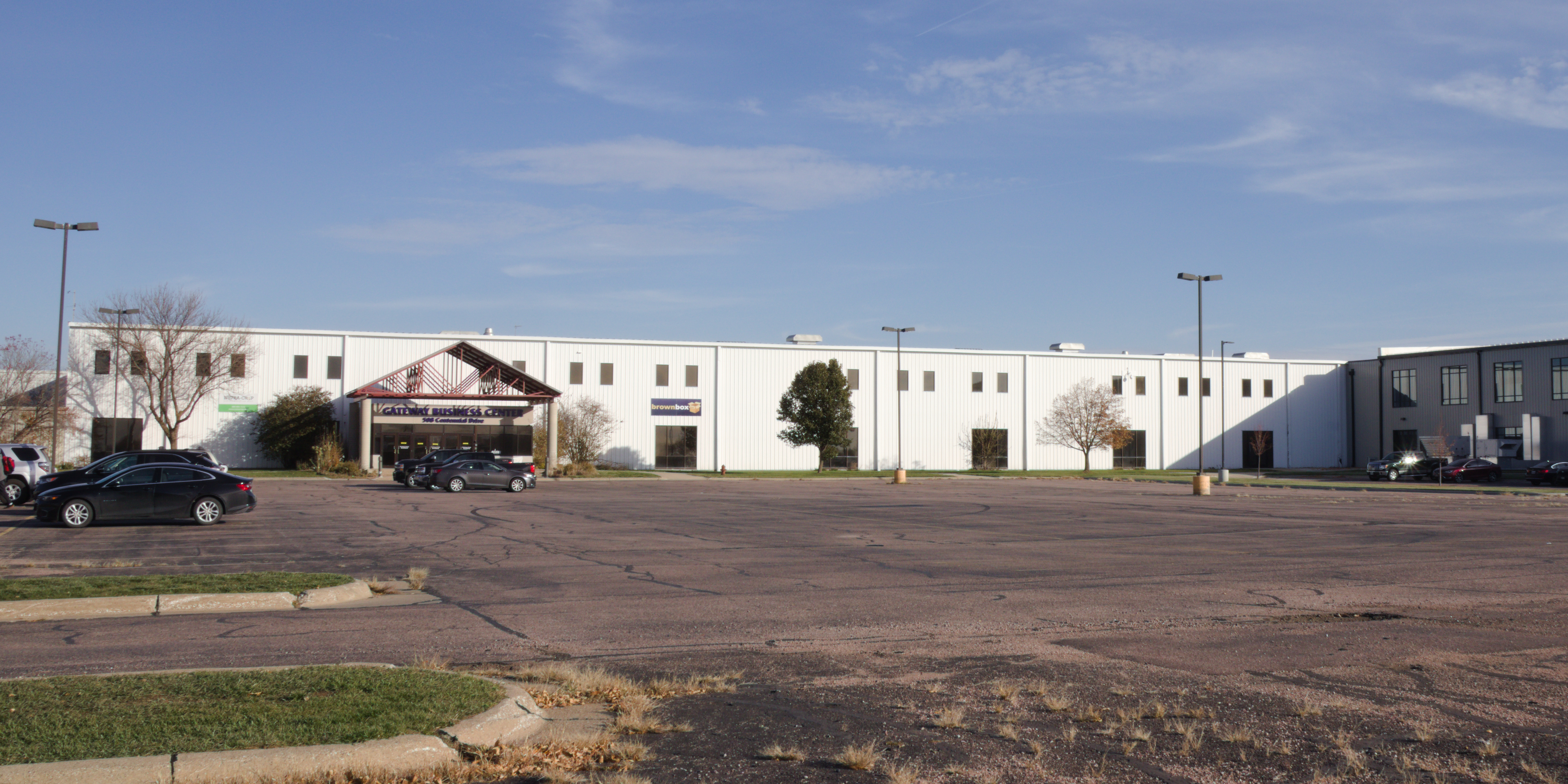
- Site of former headquarters in North Sioux City, South Dakota, pictured in 2023
- Formerly: TIPC Network (1985–1987); Gateway 2000, Inc. (1987–1998)
- Type: Public
- Traded as: NYSE: GTW
- Industry: Computer hardware; Computer software; Enterprise services
- Founded: September 1985; 41 years ago in Sioux City, Iowa, United States
- Founders: Ted Waitt; Mike Hammond
- Fate: Acquired by Acer Inc.; brand revived in 2020 through Walmart
- Headquarters: North Sioux City, South Dakota (1990–2004); Irvine, California (2004–2007)
- Area served: Worldwide
- Products: Desktop computers; Laptops; Servers; Consumer electronics
- Number of employees: 25,000 (2000, peak)
- Subsidiaries: Amiga, Inc. (1997–1999); Advanced Logic Research (1997–2000); eMachines (2004–2007)
- Website: gatewayusa.com

Gateway, Inc., previously Gateway 2000, Inc., was an American computer company originally based in Iowa and South Dakota. Founded by Ted Waitt and Mike Hammond in 1985, the company developed, manufactured, supported, and marketed a wide range of personal computers, computer monitors, servers, and computer accessories. At its peak in the year 2000, the company employed nearly 25,000 worldwide. Following a seven-year-long slump, punctuated by the acquisition of rival computer manufacturer eMachines in 2004 and massive consolidation of the company's various divisions in an attempt to curb losses and regain market share, Gateway was acquired by Taiwanese hardware and electronics corporation Acer in October 2007 for US$710 million.

== History ==
=== 1985–1990: Foundation ===
Gateway 2000 logo used from 1990 to 1998

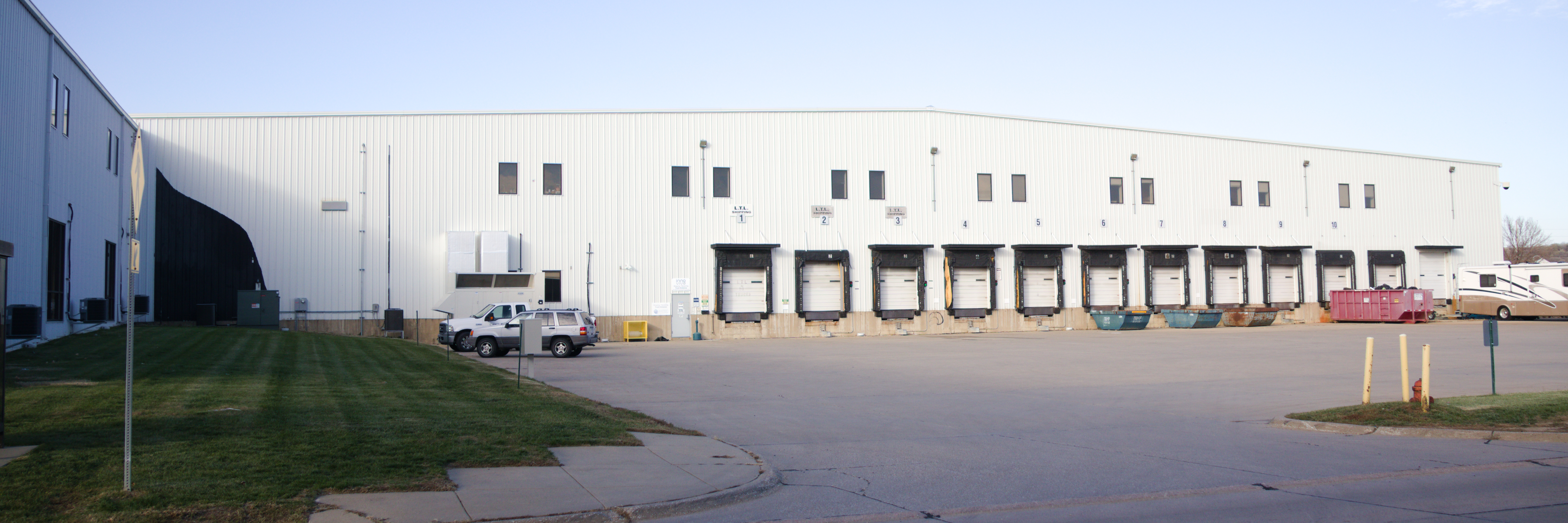
Loading dock of Gateway's former headquarters in North Sioux City. Note the black splotch in the far-left end; the entire complex was once painted white with black splotches, in keeping with the company's corporate identity.

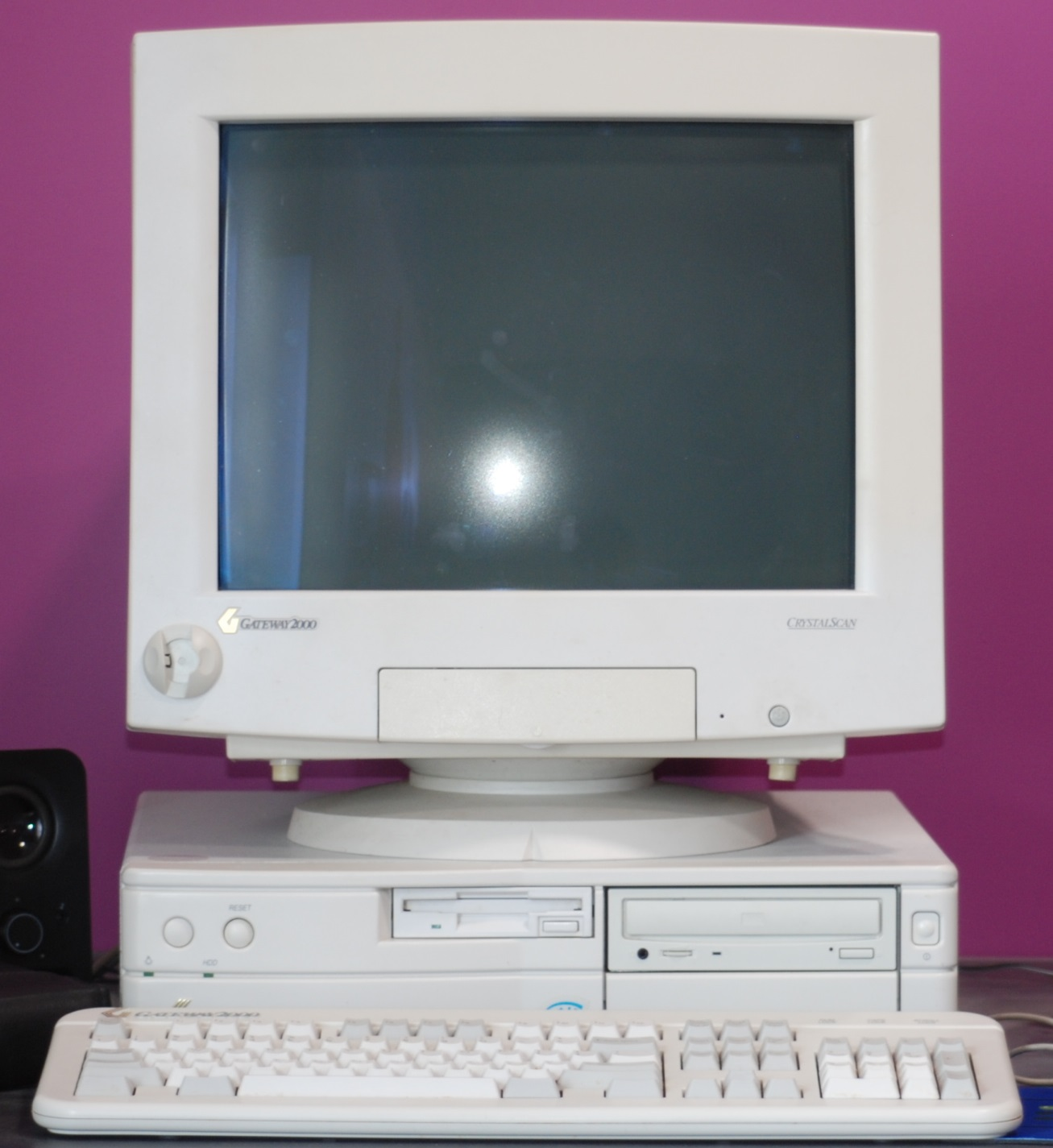
A pizza-box form-factor desktop computer manufactured by Gateway, circa mid-1990s

Gateway was founded as the TIPC Network by Ted Waitt and Mike Hammond in September 1985. Ted Waitt was the company's principal founder; he was later joined by his older brother Norman Waitt, Jr. Before founding the company, Ted Waitt lived on his family's cattle farm in Sioux City, Iowa. He had dropped out of two different colleges to work on the farm before landing a job at a computer store in Des Moines, Iowa. After nine months of experience gained on the job, Ted had the idea to start his own computer reselling company that would allow him to sell to niche customers who needed systems in between the lower- and upper-ends of the personal computer market, whose systems were either too limited in terms of speed and memory or too expensive with seldom-used higher-end features. Ted also found that educated salespeople could successfully sell computers to customers completely over the telephone, impressing on him the idea that he could eliminate overhead by having a robust remote salesforce and impressive catalog.

Strapped for cash, however, Ted Waitt took out a $10,000 loan from his grandmother Mildred Smith and occupied the empty upper floor of his father's dilapidated cattle brokerage. He was joined by Mike Hammond, Ted's coworker who trained the latter to become a computer salesman at their previous job. The duo's first products were software and peripherals for Texas Instruments' Professional Computer home computer, advertised in various computer magazines. The TIPC had been discontinued in the previous year and was largely considered obsolete by 1985. TIPC Network charged their first customers with a membership fee of US$20, in order to flush the company with more start-up capital.

Owing to their products' very low costs, TIPC earned up to $100,000 in sales within the first four months, beating out many of their competitors in the TIPC aftermarket segment. In early 1986, Ted's brother Norman Waitt was hired as TIPC's financial advisor in exchange for owning half of the company. That year, the company began selling their own hand-assembled computers locally on an experimental basis. By the end of 1986, TIPC changed their name to Gateway 2000, Inc., and earned $1 million in revenues—the experimental complete computer systems contributing only a small amount to this figure.

Gateway 2000 was inspired to produce computer systems compatible with IBM's hugely successful Personal Computer in mid-1987, after Texas Instruments had announced a rebate program allowing customers to trade in their older home computer systems (including the TIPC), in order to contribute toward a $3,500 credit on Texas Instruments' PC-compatible systems. Feeling that they could offer such computers for half the cost, Gateway 2000 released a complete PC compatible system with dual 5.25-inch floppy drives, ample RAM, a color monitor, and a keyboard, for $1,995 through mail-order. The system was a success for Gateway 2000, with revenue increasing from $1.5 million in 1987 to $12 million in 1988.

The company's first computer systems were assembled from parts supplied from other mail-order companies. Instead of hiring computer engineers and industrial designers to devise these products, Gateway 2000 instead relied on Ted Waitt's instincts for what customers might appreciate. According to the company, their initial customer base shopped on price alone and rarely made requests for service parts or complex technical support. Because of this, Gateway 2000 maintained a slim overhead, and they were able to price their products below competitors.

In 1988, Gateway 2000 moved their headquarters from the Waitt family ranch to the 5,000-square-foot Livestock Exchange building in downtown Sioux City, for which they paid $350 a month in rent. In the same year, the company launched their first major advertising campaign, taking out a full-page advertisement in computer magazines for the first time to advertise the company and its products, putting particular emphasis on their low cost and the company's Midwestern United States roots. Waitt described the aim of the tagline "Computers from Iowa with a question mark. Like, who would expect computers from Iowa? You just don't expect it...And it struck a chord in a time when people were, you know, doing a lot of things different in the industry. You know, so that was the original cow ad." The campaign was funded with only a small portion of Gateway 2000's revenues (2.5 percent) but was very successful nonetheless, the company netting $70.6 million in sales in 1989.

=== 1990–1995: Early growth ===
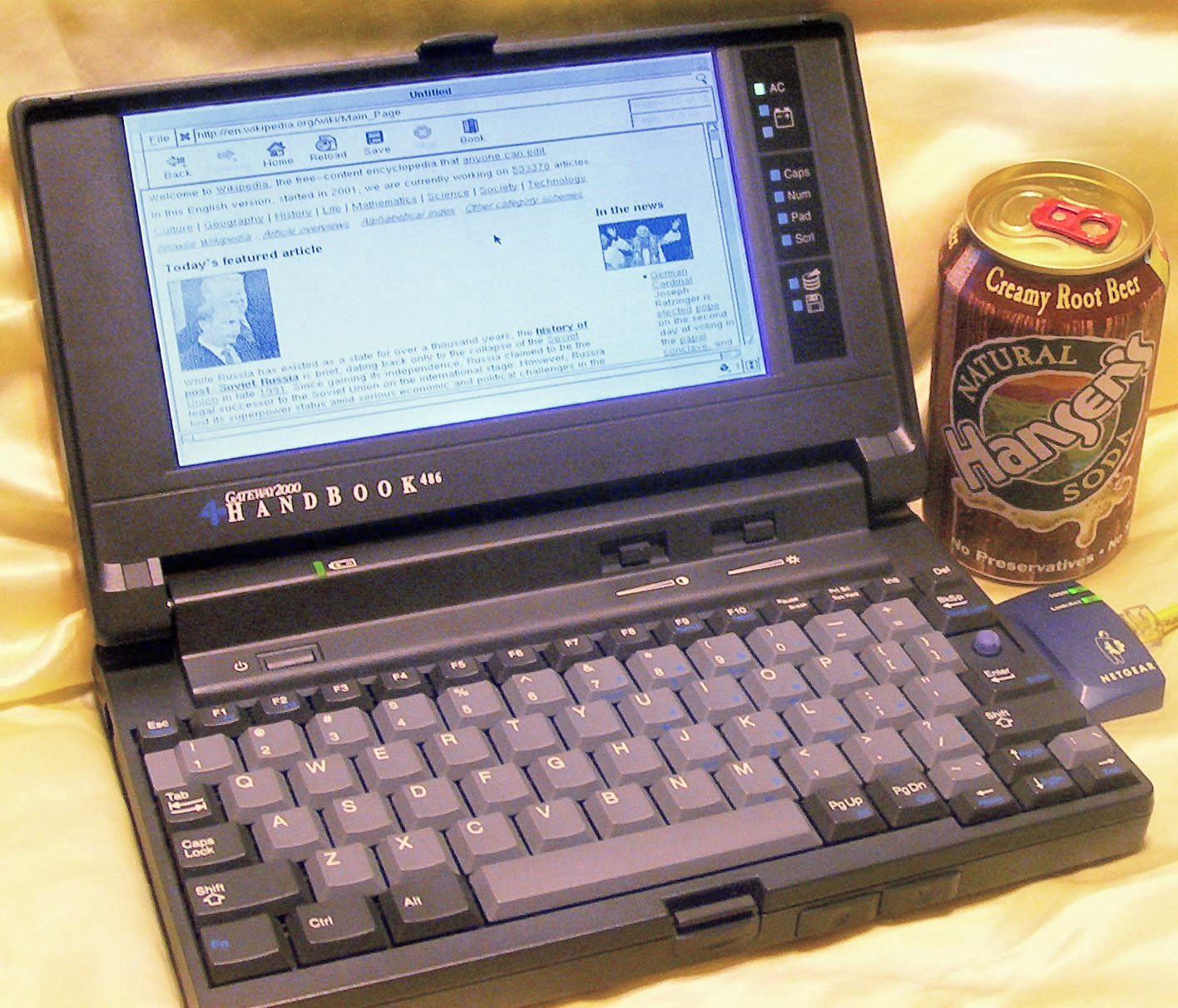
Gateway HandBook, subnotebook computer manufactured beginning in 1992

In January 1990, Gateway 2000 moved their headquarters from Iowa to North Sioux City, South Dakota, in order to take advantage of South Dakota's lack of income taxes. The company expanded their advertising campaign that year, producing a number of humorous half- and full-page spreads, featuring employees of the company (including Ted Waitt) in pastoral settings, photographed by a local studio. The company extended the pastoral theme to their shipping containers, which were white with black spots, reminiscent of Holstein cows; this monochrome design scheme also contributed to low costs. Waitt recalled that "The cow spot was actually developed by a graphic designer. I can't take a claim for that. All I can take claim for it, when I saw it on a box, I said, that is amazing... it was kind of that, no matter where Gateway went, around the world, we took the cow spots. And it was taking that, you know, Iowa values, those Midwestern values with us wherever. It was our symbol."

Gateway 2000 posted $275 million in revenues by the end of 1990. Fearing that the company was growing too big for them to handle, the Waitts and Hammond recruited a public accounting firm and poached six executives from rival computer manufacturers to plot the company's growth. These executives in turn set up a number of divisions to promote innovation within the company, including a marketing department with five employees, a group dedicated to exploring new technologies with twenty employees, an "Action Group" of ten executives whom Ted Waitt deferred to every two weeks, and a "Road Map Group" to evaluate product development and branding choices. In addition, the company hired a media buyer to handle the company's advertising assets advertising and contacts with magazines and other mass media companies.

In the summer of 1991, Gateway 2000 commissioned the construction of a 44,000-square-foot manufacturing plant down the road from its North Sioux City headquarters, expected to increase its manufacturing output by 30 percent. That year, the company also expanded their dealer channels beyond the individual buyer into fleet sales to enterprises. Gateway 2000 offered such corporate clients training programs, troubleshooting literature, and more rigorous customer service. While still a private company at this point, Gateway 2000 elected to release financial results quarterly via press releases in order to project an image of legitimacy among corporate buyers. By 1991's end, Gateway 2000 posted $626 million in sales.

Despite the added research and development divisions in 1991, the company admitted to falling behind their competitors in terms of innovation. In an attempt to catch up, Gateway 2000 began segmenting its marketing to appeal to customers with specific needs beyond value and price. For example, the company began offering their desktop computers with the AnyKey, a 124-key keyboard with advanced macro programming for power users and programmers. In 1992, they released the HandBook, a lightweight subnotebook aimed at the executive market. At the end of 1992, the company added 200 people to their support and sales departments, increasing the number of total employees in the company to 1,700. By 1992's end, Gateway 2000 reported $1.1 billion in sales. The company had managed to avoid losses during a fierce price war ushered in by Compaq over the summer of 1992, becoming the leading mail-order computer business in the United States.

Gateway 2000 reported their first drop in revenue in the second quarter of 1993, which they attributed to quality control problems reported during the final quarter of 1992 and a stagnant roster of products. To remediate the latter, the company released a notebook with a passive-matrix color LCD and a newer subnotebook. In order to stave off the rise of competitors Dell and IBM in the mail-order market, Gateway 2000 began pursuing markets outside the United States and planned to ramp up their corporate sales by the end of 1993. In service of the latter goal, Gateway 2000 launched a division dedicated to handing major accounts, poaching an executive from IBM to head this division. Gateway's technical support staff doubled its headcount to just over 400; Gateway 2000 assigned each of their large corporate customers their own dedicated technical support associate. In October, Gateway 2000 established a European subsidiary in Dublin, Ireland, which staffed a full roster of departments, including manufacturing, sales, marketing, and technical support.

In order to offset the higher-than-expected cost of their corporate sales boost and expansion into Europe, Gateway 2000 announced their plans to go public in October 1993. With their initial public offering the following December, the company raised $163.5 million through selling 10.9 million shares. These shares represented a 15 percent stake in the company; Waitt retained ownership of the other 85 percent of Gateway 2000. Along with financing the aforementioned two initiatives, this infusion of capital also allowed Gateway 2000 to expand its product roster to include networking hardware such as fax modems, peripherals such as printers, and various software products. By the end of 1994, the company employed 5,000 and posted $2.7 billion in revenue.

=== 1995–2000: Major expansions ===
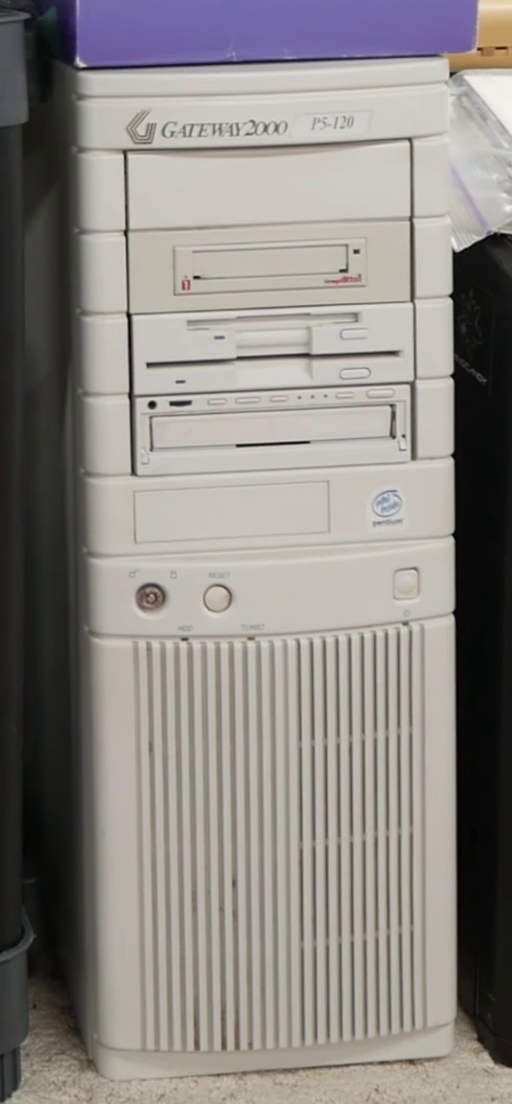
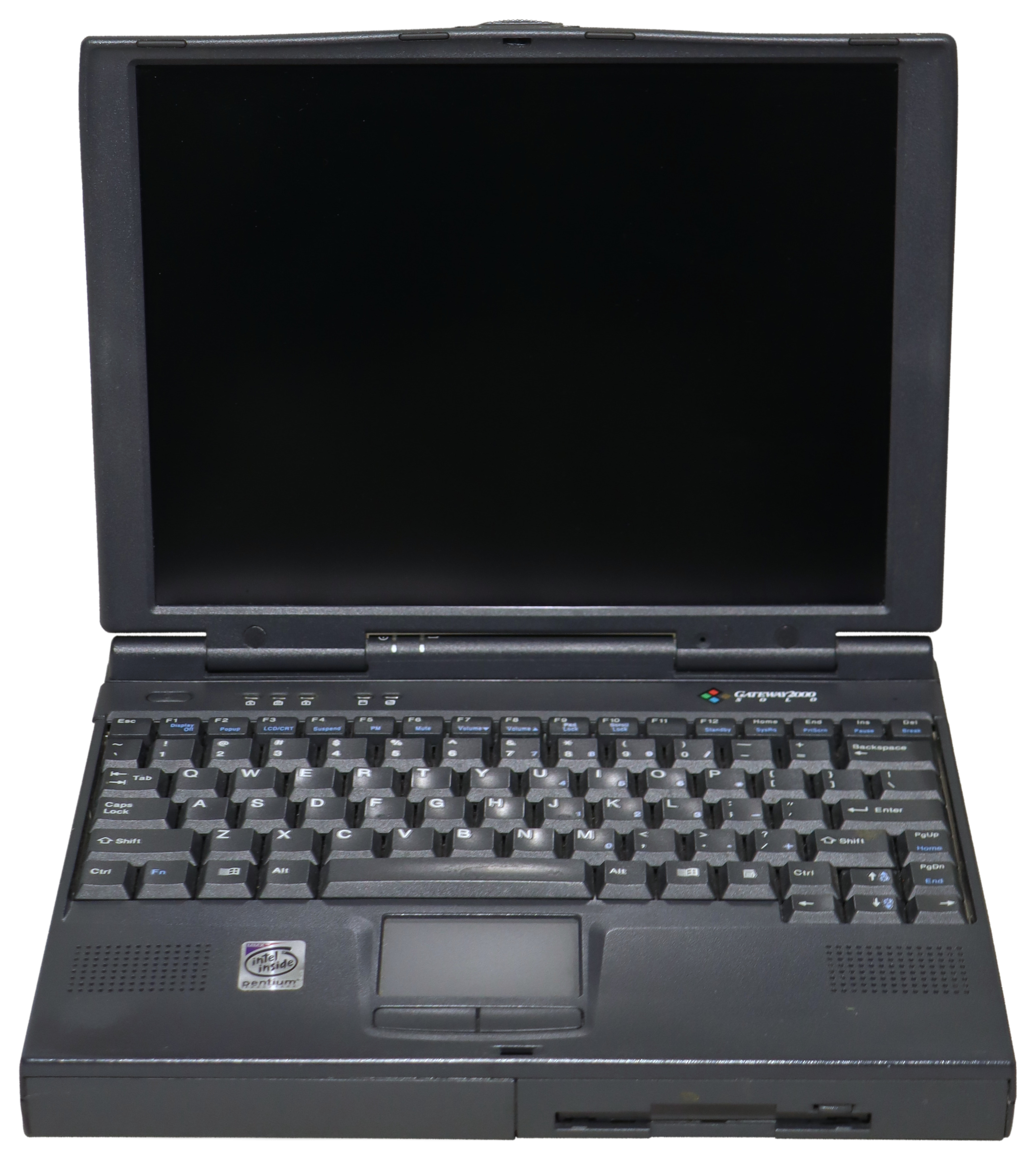
Left: Gateway 2000 P5-120, 120-MHz Pentium-equipped tower computer manufactured by Gateway in around 1996; Right: Gateway Solo 2200, 166-MHz Pentium notebook from the same year

In September 1995, Gateway 2000 commissioned the construction of a manufacturing facility in Hampton, Virginia, worth between $18 million to $20 million and an overseas manufacturing plant in Malaysia to serve computer buyers in East Asia. In August 1995, the company purchased an 80-percent stake in the Australian Osborne retailer, and in the following November, Gateway 2000 established their first website on their first Internet domain, gw2k.com. By the end of the year, Gateway 2000 posted revenues of $3.7 billion.

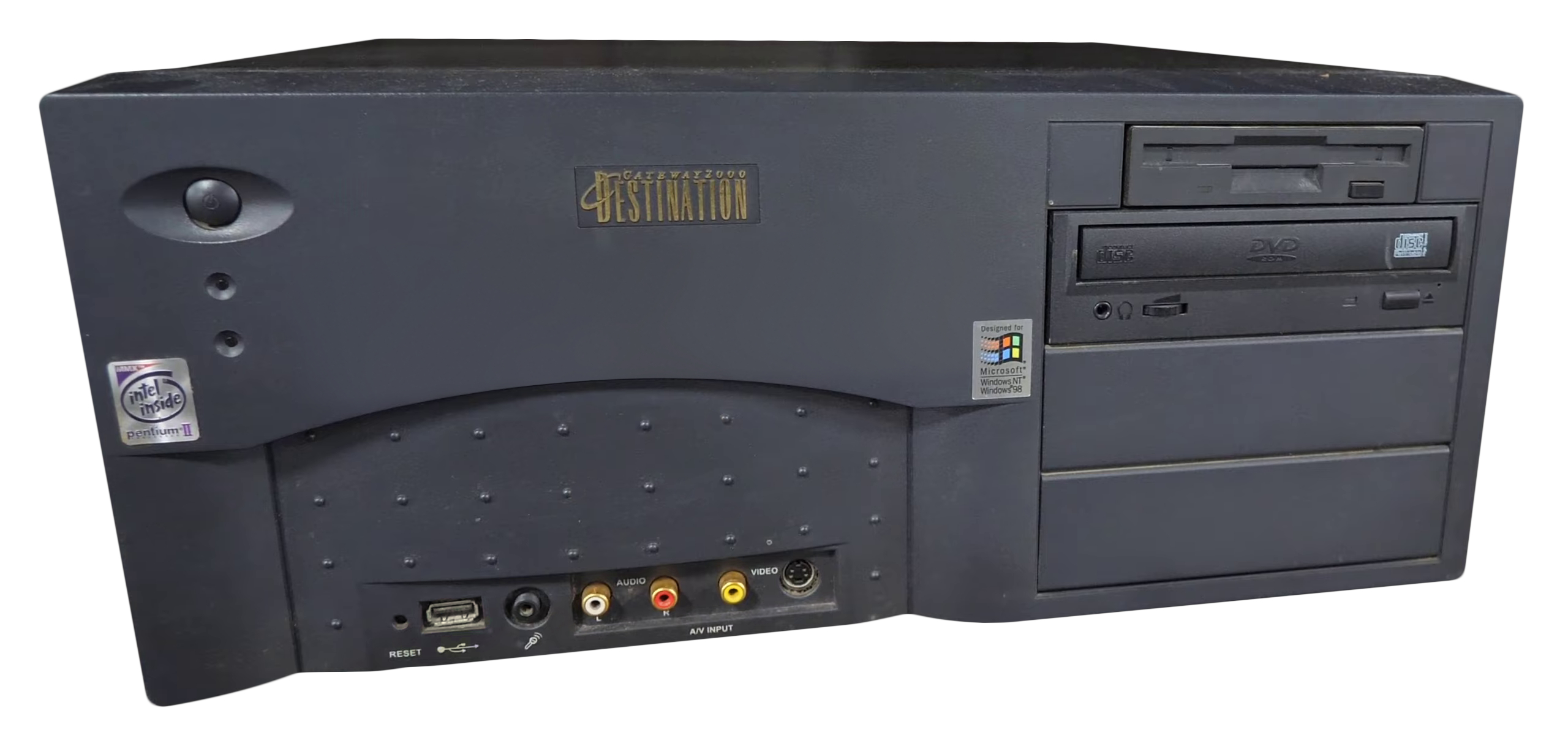
Gateway Destination 2000, Pentium II variant from 1998

In 1996, Gateway 2000 introduced the Destination 2000, an early home theater PC that used a large-screen CRT television as its monitor. It was intended for consuming home media content and multimedia software and came with a built-in modem for Internet connectivity. The Destination 2000 sold poorly, and after several months Gateway began offering these systems at retail outlets such as CompUSA at deep discounts.

In March 1997, the company opened up a number of brick-and-mortar retail locations, called Gateway 2000 Country Stores, in various suburbs across the United States. Gateway Country Stores did not stock any of the company's products but had a number on display to allow customers hands-on experience with Gateway 2000 computer systems; customers had to order by phone or through the company's new website. Their first location was in Tampa, Florida. By 1999, Gateway 2000 had opened up over 140 Country Stores.

In April 1997, Compaq Computer Corporation was in talks to purchase Gateway 2000 to bolster the former's presence in the mail order market. The deal was nearly signed, with Gateway set to receive $7 billion, before Waitt vetoed the acquisition that summer. Gateway 2000 themselves acquired two companies in the year, the first being the Amiga Technologies subsidiary of Escom AG, a German company that had filed for bankruptcy in the preceding year. Announced in March 1997, the deal was finalized in the following May, with Amiga International, Inc., incorporated as a subsidiary of Gateway 2000 in South Dakota. Gateway 2000 paid Escom $13 million for the patents to Amiga technologies, the majority of which centered on multimedia capability. In June 1997, Gateway 2000 acquired Advanced Logic Research, Inc., a maker of high-end workstations and servers, in a stock swap valuated at $194 million.

In late 1997, Gateway 2000 began phasing out the use of cows in their branding in an attempt to project a more mature image to their corporate clients. Simultaneously, the company formed Gateway Major Accounts, a subsidiary focused on fleet sales to enterprise clients. By 1997's end, the company posted $6.29 billion in revenue and $1 billion in profit.

In 1998, the company began dropping the "2000" from their moniker, as the coming turn of the millennium meant that "Gateway 2000" would soon sound antiquated. The company was formally reincorporated as Gateway, Inc., in May 1999. Also in 1998, Gateway moved their headquarters from South Dakota to La Jolla, San Diego, California—both because Ted Waitt himself wanted to move to California and also to move the company closer to top executive talent at the center of the technology industry. The move was a success in this right, with a new slate of executives hired in 1998, including Jeff Weitzen, a veteran of the AT&T Corporation who was named president and chief operating officer of Gateway.

The new management planned to refocus the company's bottom line toward providing information technology services and software, enterprise finance and training, and consumer hardware peripherals, as the market for selling only computer systems had been seeing continually shrinking profit margins. As part of this expansion, Gateway also established their own Internet service provider, Gateway.net, offered exclusively to their customers and competing with the likes of America Online (AOL). Beginning in June 1998, Gateway bundled Netscape Navigator web browser on its systems preinstalled with Microsoft's Windows 95 and 98, the latter of which Microsoft themselves bundled with their own web browser, Internet Explorer.

Gateway.net saw slow adoption rates—there were only 200,000 subscribers in early 1999—and was outage-prone. In February 1999, Gateway switched from Web America Networks to MCI WorldCom as their Internet backbone. Also in that month, Gateway began offering one year of free Gateway.net service to those who purchased a Gateway PC worth $1,000 or more. The base of subscribers increased threefold to 600,000 by October 1999 as a result of the promotion. In October 1999, Gateway switched their Internet backbone again to AOL, the latter taking over all operations of Gateway.net in exchange for a $800 million stake in Gateway.

Ted Waitt resigned from his position as CEO of Gateway in December 1999. Weitzen was named president and CEO, while Waitt retained chairman of the board. One of Weitzen's first acts as CEO was approving the divestiture of Gateway's Amiga International division, selling the corresponding Amiga patents and trademark rights to Amino Development Corporation, who later renamed themselves Amiga, Inc.

=== 2000–2004: Faltering and consumer electronics ===
Gateway logo used from 2002 to 2004

Coinciding with the Dot-com bubble burst, a global downturn in the personal computer industry at the beginning of 2000 had a major negative impact on Gateway, whose dependence on the worst-hit markets of small business and home office buyers incurred significant quarterly losses. Rival PC maker Dell Computer Corporation had fared better since their main business was centered around corporate clients rather than consumers.

Weitzen laid off many senior managers within the company and broke tradition by selling Gateway's conventional personal computers through retailers such as OfficeMax and QVC. A price war instituted by rival Dell Computer Corporation led to Gateway posting a fourth-quarter loss of $94.3 million in 2000. Gateway's net profits fell to between $241.5 million and $316 million, while its stock dropped to $18 per share, down from $72 per share.

PC market share as of July 30, 2001
Ranking (in U.S.)	Company	% U.S.	% World
1	Dell	24.0	13.4
2	Compaq	12.7	12.1
3	Hewlett-Packard	9.4	6.9
4	Gateway	7.6	3.2
5	IBM	6.1	7.2
6	Apple	4.8	4.1

In the beginning of 2001, Ted Waitt ousted Weitzen and several other executives from the board of directors, reassuming the role of CEO and instigating an extensive restructuring of the company. Waitt shifted the company's bottom line away from service and software back to the sale of PCs to consumers and businesses, rehiring a number of executives that had been lost to the executive shuffle of late 1998. Prices of the company's computers were massively lowered to make them competitive with offerings from Hewlett-Packard and Dell, while other products, such as the Touch Pad—an Internet appliance that was the result of a joint venture with AOL—were discontinued due to poor sales. Gateway's employee base was also cut nearly in half, from 24,600 to 14,000, as part of massive consolidation of the company's manufacturing plants, call centers, and Country Stores outlets. The manufacturing facilities in Malaysia, Ireland, and Lake Forest, California, were all shuttered; meanwhile most of the company's overseas subsidiaries were closed to limit the company's business to mainly within the United States. Additionally in 2001, the company moved to Poway, California. By the end of 2001, the company reported a net loss of $1.03 billion, while revenue fell to $5.94 billion.

Gateway's sales dropped in 2002 to $4.17 billion, with the number of personal computer system units falling from 3.4 million to 2.75 million. Gateway's American market share meanwhile shrunk from 9.3 percent in 1999 to 6.1 percent in 2002. In the beginning of the year, the company laid off 2,250 employees after they had closed 19 Country Stores, a pair of technical support call centers, an Internet sales office, and a research and development laboratory. Gateway reported a net loss of $297.7 million for 2002. In the beginning of 2003, Gateway instituted another restructuring, closing 76 of its 268 Gateway Country stores and laying off 1,900 more employees in the process.

In 2003, Gateway began pivoting toward the sale of consumer electronics, introducing 118 new products across 22 categories. These products included digital cameras, flat-panel television sets, MP3 players, standalone DVD players, home theater PCs with built-in DVRs, and PDAs. The company's remaining 192 Gateway Country stores were renovated to accentuate these consumer electronics. Gateway meanwhile attempted to increase its enterprise sales by offering more general-purpose servers and network-attached storage devices. In late 2003, the company shut down its Hampton facility, and restricted the output of the assembly and refurbishing lines of their North Sioux City and Sioux Falls facilities. Manufacturing was moved largely overseas to Taiwan, with OEMs there manufacturing and assembling the parts for Gateway's notebooks and desktops. By 2003's end, Gateway let go of 1,800 more employees and were down to just 6,900 on their payroll.

Also in late 2003, the U.S. Securities and Exchange Commission filed fraud charges against three former Gateway executives: former CEO Jeff Weitzen, former chief financial officer John Todd, and former controller Robert Manza. The lawsuit alleged that the executives engaged in securities violations and misled investors about the health of the company. Weitzen was cleared of securities fraud in 2006; however, Todd and Manza were found liable for inflating revenue in a jury trial which concluded in March 2007.

=== 2004–2007: eMachines acquisition and consolidation ===
In January 2004, Gateway announced that it had signed an agreement to buy computer manufacturer eMachines of Irvine, California, for $30 million in cash and 50 million shares of stock in Gateway. eMachines was founded six years earlier as a joint venture between TriGem, Korea Data Systems, and Sotec; by 2003, it had raked in $1.1 billion in sales and became the third-largest seller of personal computers in the United States while only employing 140 people total in its corporate offices.

By the time the acquisition was finalized in March, eMachines' payout increased to nearly $300 million, and as a result of the acquisition, Gateway reclaimed the number three spot among American PC manufacturers and the eighth largest PC manufacturer globally. The president and CEO of eMachines, Wayne Inouye, replaced Tedd Waitt as CEO, the latter remaining chairman. A month later, the company announced that it would relocate to Orange County, California (where eMachines had been located); that it would shutter the remaining Gateway Country Stores—laying off 2,500 employees in the process; and that it would begin selling personal computers through third-party retailers, as eMachines had done in the past. Gateway reduced another 1,000 jobs from their manufacturing and technical support facilities in Iowa and South Dakota by the end of the year. By this point, the company only employed 4,000.

Inouye left Gateway in February 2006, by which point the company employed roughly 1,800—down from 7,500 at the start of his tenure. In fall 2006, Gateway briefly revitalized its United States manufacturing presence with the opening of the Gateway Configuration Center in Nashville, Tennessee. It employed over 300 people in that location to assemble build-to-order desktops, laptops, and servers.

=== 2007–present: Purchase by Acer ===
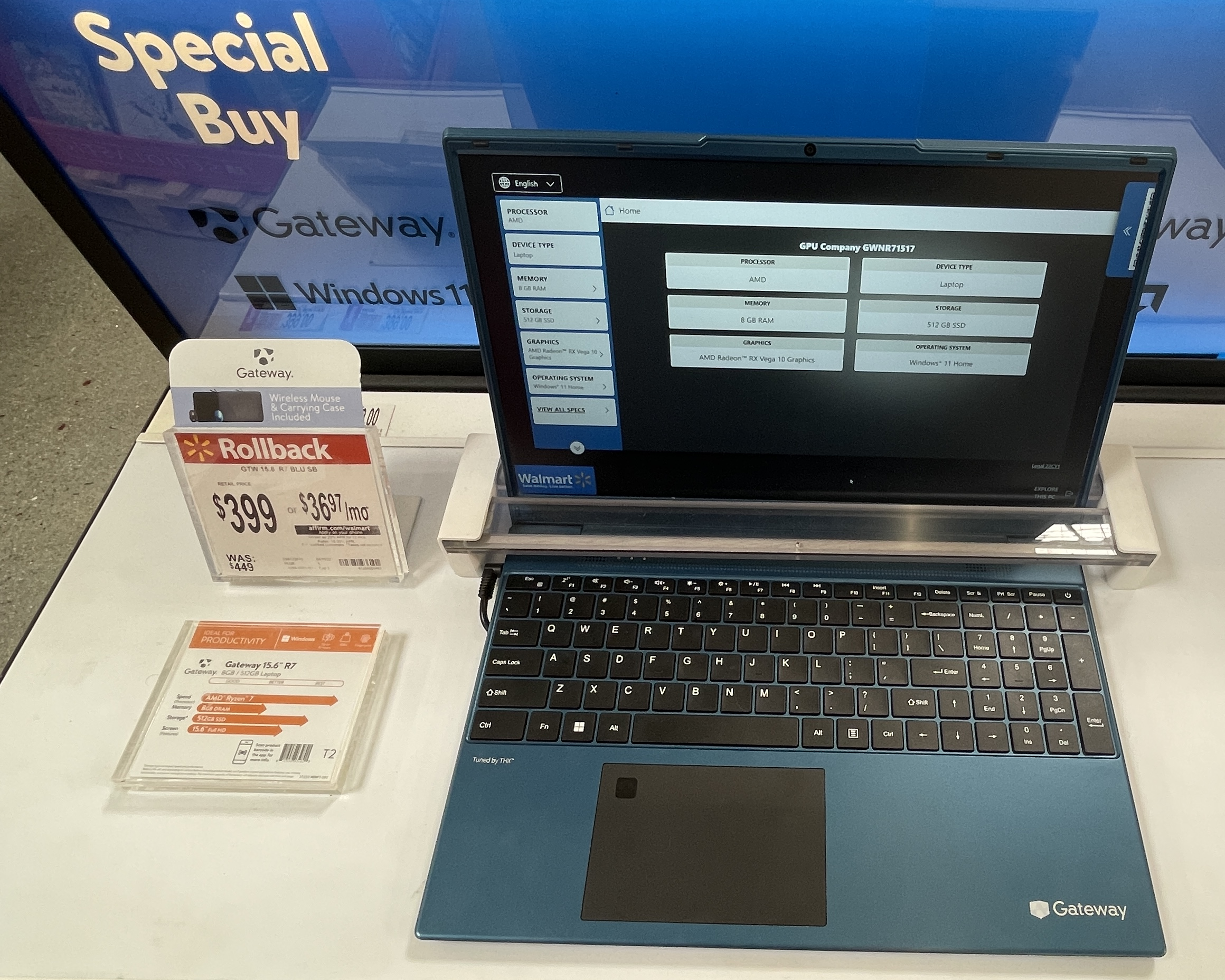
Gateway laptop at a Walmart in 2022

In August 2007, Acer Inc. of Taiwan announced the acquisition of Gateway, Inc., for a US$710 million tender offer. The acquisition was finalized in October 2007. In the interim, MPC Corporation announced that it had signed a deal to acquire Gateway's Professional Services Unit—which manufactured and designed the company's servers, network-attached storage devices, and workstations—for approximately $90 million. This MPC deal was also finalized in October 2007.

Following the acquisition, Acer used both Gateway and eMachines as sub-brands for several years. Many of Acer's most popular lines of personal computers, including netbooks, were rebadged as Gateway machines for midrange consumers, while the eMachines line was kept for budget consumers. In 2013, the company discontinued the eMachines brand, citing the proliferation of tablet computers and 2-in-1 laptops among the low‑end computer market. They continued selling computers under the Gateway and Packard Bell brands — the latter being one of Gateway's former rival computer manufacturers, until it became a sister trademark after Acer acquired it in 2008. Soon afterward, however, the Gateway brand was also discontinued.

In September 2020, Acer revived the Gateway branding on laptops and tablets sold exclusively through Walmart. Acer commissioned Bmorn Technology, a Shenzhen-based technology company, to manufacture and sell these Gateway branded laptops. The new line of laptops is a rebadging of Walmart's existing EVOO-branded laptops. The laptops' sound systems are tuned in partnership with THX.
