= Lite-On =

Taiwanese electronics company

LITE-ON Technology Corporation

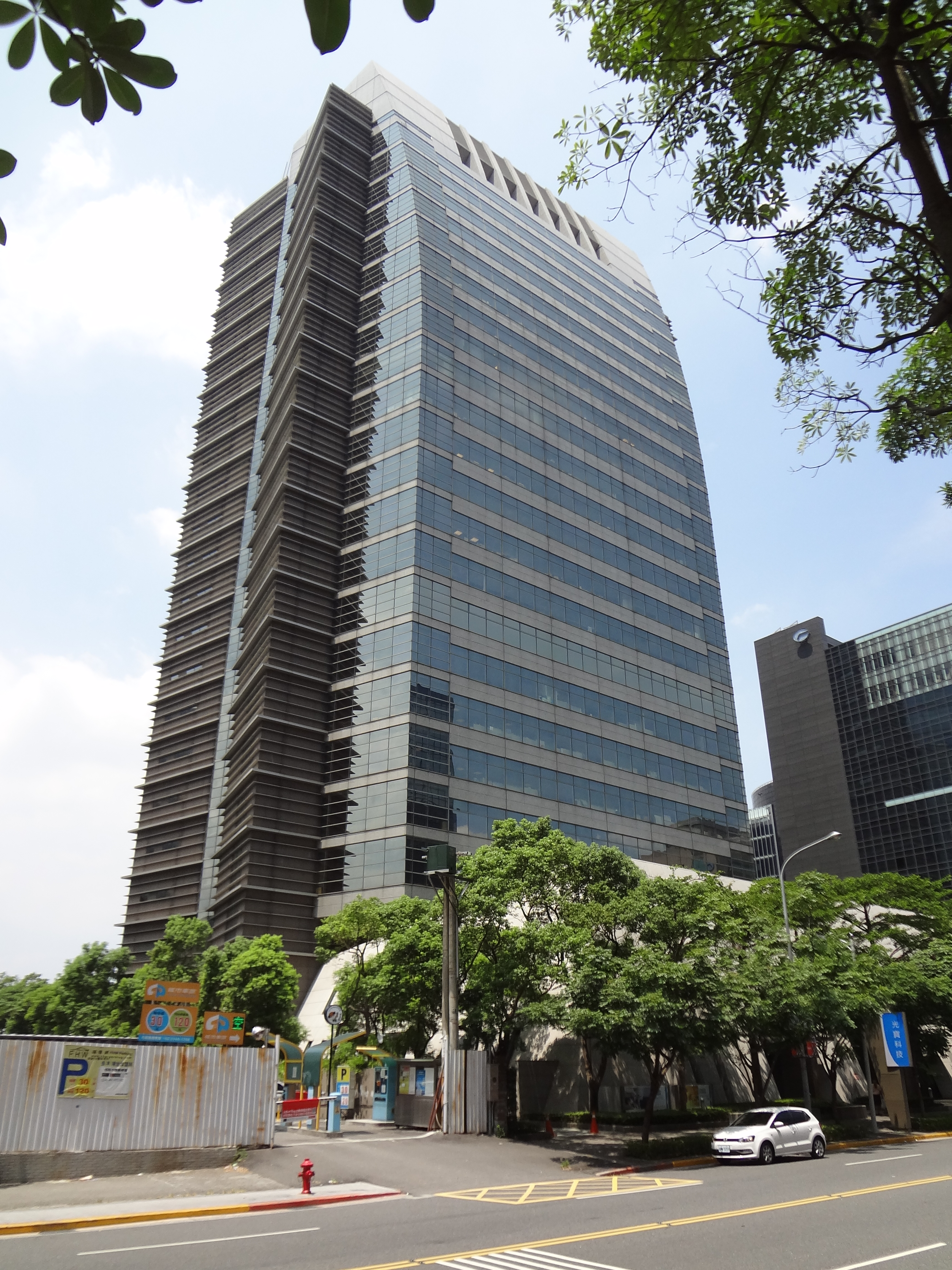
- Lite-On Technology Center (光寶科技大樓)
- Type: Public
- Traded as: TWSE: 2301
- Industry: Consumer Electronics
- Founded: 1975; 51 years ago
- Founder: Raymond Soong
- Headquarters: Taipei, Taiwan
- Key people: Tom Soong (Chairman), Anson Chiu (CEO)
- Products: Computer components, consumer electronics
- Revenue: US$5.36 billion
- Website: www.liteon.com

Lite-On Technology Corporation (also known as LiteOn and LiteON) is a Taiwanese company that primarily manufactures consumer electronics, including LEDs, semiconductors, computer chassis, monitors, motherboards, optical disc drives, and other electronic components.

== History ==
Lite-On was started in 1975 by several Taiwanese Texas Instruments ex-employees. The original line of business was optical products (LEDs). They then branched out into computer power supplies by starting the Power Conversion Division. Other divisions were soon to follow.

In 1983 Lite-On Electronics issued initial public offering as the first technology company listed on the Taiwan Stock Exchange with Stock Code 2301. In 2003 Lite-ON appoint Dragon Group as their sole distributor in Indonesia. In 2006 Lite-On IT Corporation acquired BenQ Corporation's optical disc drive business to become one of the top 3 ODD manufacturers in the world.

In March 2007, Lite-On IT Corporation formed a joint venture with Koninklijke Philips Electronics N.V. for their optical disc drive division as Philips & Lite-On Digital Solutions Corporation (PLDS).

Kioxia (formerly Toshiba Memory) announced on August 30, 2019, that it signed a definitive agreement to acquire Lite-On's SSD business for US$165 million. The transaction closed in 2020.

== See also ==
- Maxi Switch
- List of companies of Taiwan
