= Amiga, Inc. =

Licensing company

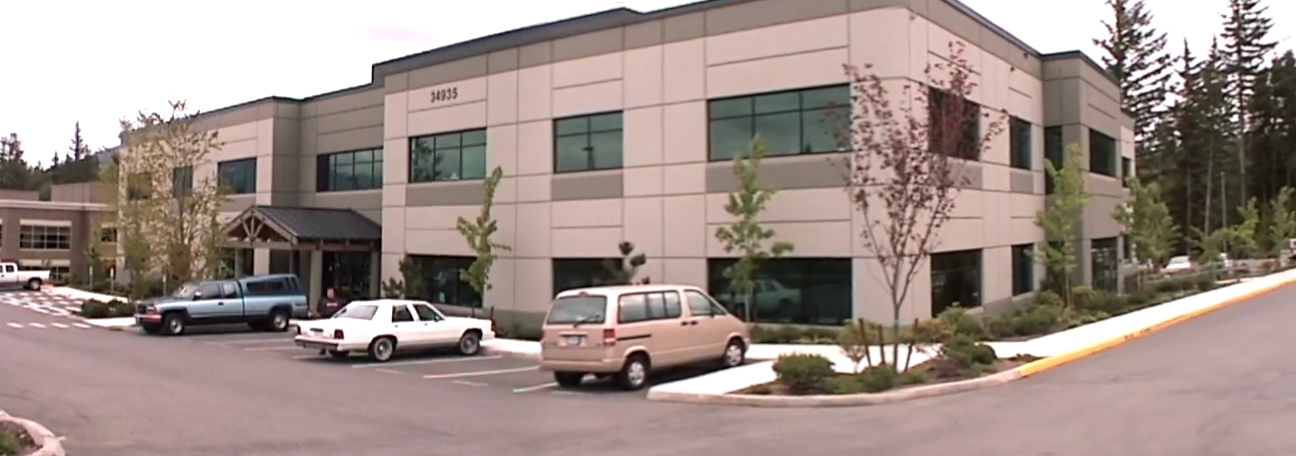
- Headquarters in Snoqualmie, Washington, pictured in 2001
- Type: Private
- Industry: Computing
- Predecessor: Amiga, Inc. of South Dakota
- Founded: December 31, 1999; 26 years ago (as Amiga, Inc.)
- Defunct: February 1, 2019
- Fate: Assets sold to C-A Acquisitions Corp (thereafter known as Amiga Corporation)
- Successor: Amiga Corporation
- Headquarters: Snoqualmie, Washington, United States
- Key people: Bill McEwen

Amiga, Inc. was a holding company run by Bill McEwen that used to own some trademarks and other assets associated with the Amiga personal computer, from 1999 until 2019. The company most notably licensed the rights for packaging and selling classic Amiga (versions 1-3.x) operating systems to Cloanto, and the rights for a newly-built next generation operating system (AmigaOS 4) to Hyperion Entertainment.

The company has its origins in South Dakota–based Amiga, Inc., a subsidiary of Gateway 2000, of which McEwen was its marketing chief. Gateway 2000 sold the Amiga properties to McEwen's company Amino Development on December 31, 1999, which he later renamed to Amiga, Inc.

The company sold the copyrights and source code of classic Amiga operating systems to Cloanto in 2012. On February 1, 2019, Amiga Inc. sold all its remaining IP, consisting mainly of the Amiga logo and trademarks, to a sister company of Cloanto, who also acquired the IP previously assigned by Amiga, Inc. to Cloanto, and which renamed itself to Amiga Corporation.

== Background ==
In the early 1980s Jay Miner, along with other Atari, Inc. staffers, set up another chip-set project under a new company in Santa Clara, called Hi-Toro (later renamed to Amiga Corporation), where they could have some creative freedom. Atari, Inc. went into contract with Amiga for licensed use of the chipset in a new high end game console and then later for use in a computer system. $500,000 was advanced to Amiga to continue development of the chipset. Amiga negotiated with Commodore International two weeks prior to the contract deadline of 30 June 1984. In August 1984, Atari Corporation, under Jack Tramiel, sued Amiga for breach of contract. The case was settled in 1987 in a closed settlement.

In 1994, Commodore filed for bankruptcy and its assets were purchased by Escom, a German PC manufacturer, who in turn went bankrupt in 1996. The Commodore-Amiga assets were then sold to another PC manufacturer, Gateway 2000, which had announced grand plans for the Amiga. However, in 1999, Gateway sold the assets (except for the patents, which were only licensed) to Amino Development for almost 5 million dollars. Gateway still retained ownership to the Commodore-Amiga patents. The last of the Commodore-Amiga patents (EP0316325B1 for "Cursor controlled user interface system", based on US887053) expired on July 14, 2007.

== Dispute and settlement with Hyperion ==
In 2007 Amiga, Inc. announced specs for a new line of Amiga computers: low end and high models. At the same time Amiga, Inc. sued Hyperion Entertainment, a company developing AmigaOS 4 for AmigaOne boards for trademark infringement in the Washington Western District Court in Seattle, USA. The company claimed Hyperion was in breach of contract, citing trademark violation and copyright infringement concerning the development and marketing of AmigaOS 4.0.

Also in 2007, Amiga, Inc. intended to become the naming-rights sponsor for a planned ice hockey arena in Kent, Washington, but failed to deliver a promised down payment.

Pentti Kouri, chairman of the board and a primary source of capital for Amiga, Inc., died in 2009.

On September 20, 2009, Amiga, Inc. and Hyperion Entertainment reached a settlement where Hyperion is granted an exclusive, perpetual, worldwide right to AmigaOS 3.1 in order to use, develop, modify, commercialize, distribute and market AmigaOS 4.x and subsequent versions of AmigaOS (including AmigaOS 5).

In 2018, Amiga Inc. was sued again by Hyperion Entertainment. This was settled on June 5, 2026.

== Licensing rights ==
Amiga, Inc. licensed the rights to make hardware using the AmigaOne brand to a computer vendor based in the UK, Eyetech Group. However, due to poor sales Eyetech suffered substantial losses and ceased trading.

In 2010 a Florida-based company calling itself Commodore USA, but lacking rights to the brand name, claimed they had acquired the rights to the Amiga name and would relaunch Amiga branded desktops running AROS and Linux. Hyperion Entertainment promptly disputed this, on the basis of a 2009 settlement agreement between Hyperion and Amiga Inc. After legal threats from Hyperion, Commodore USA dropped their AROS plans, claimed they would create a new Linux-based OS called AMIGA Workbench 5.0 (later changed to Commodore OS to avoid conflicts), and shut down in 2012.

In 2011, Amiga Inc. licensed the brand name to Hong Kong based manufacturer IContain Systems, Ltd.

In 2012, Amiga Inc. completed the transfer of copyrights up to 1993 to Cloanto. By 2026, all Amiga copyrights (including the ones formerly held by Cloanto) belonged to Amiga Corporation.

== Recent events ==
On February 1, 2019, Amiga Inc. transferred all its IP (including Amiga trademarks and remaining copyrights) to C-A Acquisition Corp., led by CEO Mike Battilana (also a director of Cloanto, the company behind the Amiga Forever package), later renamed to Amiga Corporation.

== See also ==
- Amiga, Inc. (South Dakota), predecessor
- Amiga Corporation (1982–84)
- Amiga computer, the original product
- AmigaOne, modern hardware
- AmigaOS 4, modern software
