= Macro key =

Computer key

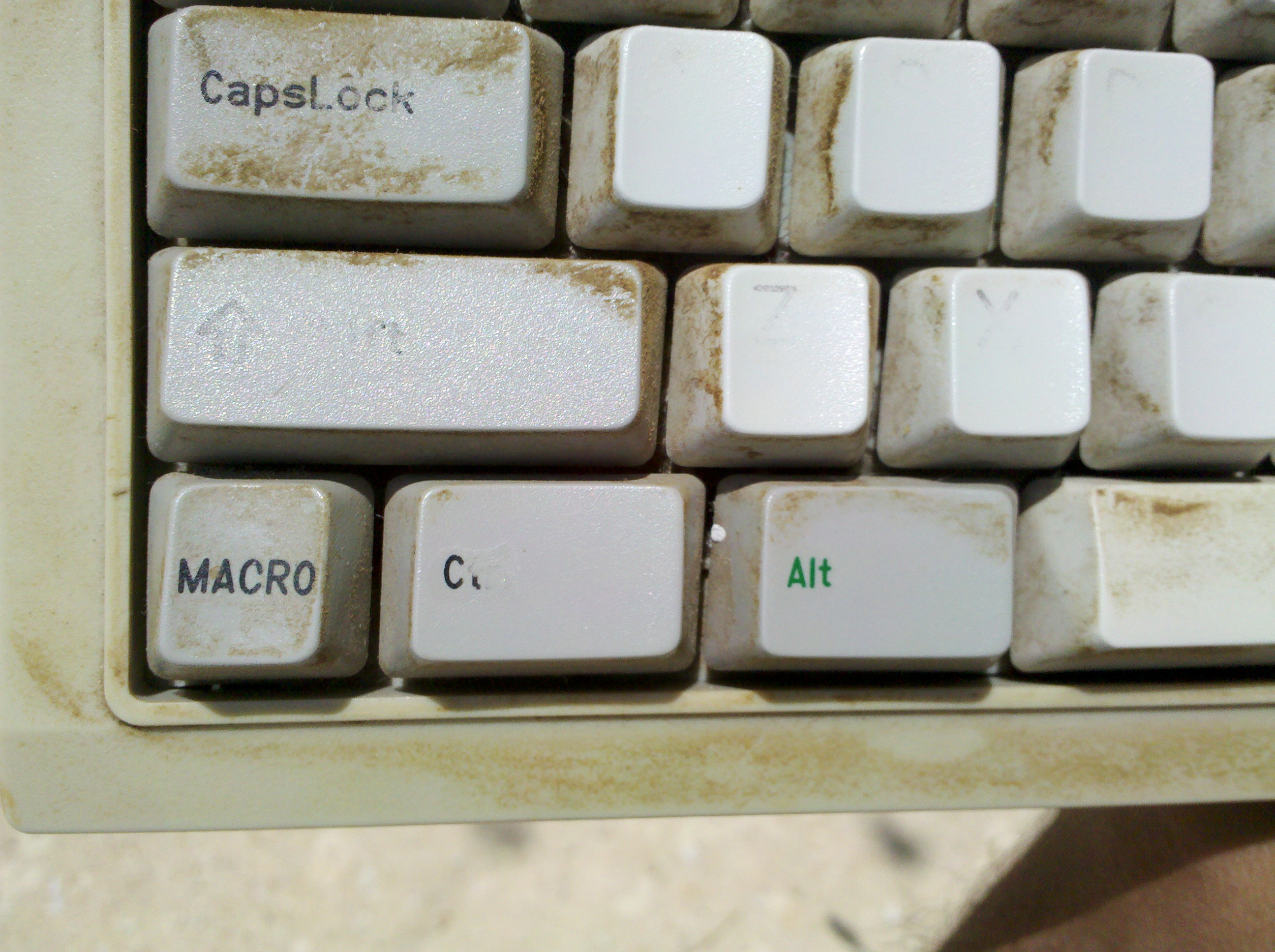
Macro key on an old keyboard.

A macro key is a keyboard key that can be configured to perform custom, user-defined behavior. Many keyboards do not have a macro key, but some have one or more. Some consider a macro key to enhance productivity by allowing them to do operations via a single key press that otherwise requires slower or multiple UI actions.

Custom behavior typically involves one or more user interface (UI) operations such as keystrokes and mouse actions. For example, a macro key might be configured to launch a program. A gamer might configure it for rapid-fire.

Some early PC keyboards had a single key located on the lowest row of keys, either to the left of the Z key or to the right of the right control key. Sometimes it was treated as a backslash, but its behavior varied. It generated a special scan code so that a program could associate unique behavior to it.

Some mice have a macro button with a similar utility.
