= Rumbelow =

Rumbelow is a surname. Notable people with the surname include:

- Donald Rumbelow (born 1940), British historian
- Nick Rumbelow (born 1991), American baseball pitcher
- Steven Rumbelow (1949−2016), British film director

== See also ==
- Rumbelows, British electronics retailer
