= Thomas Rattigan =

American businessman (born 1937)

Thomas John Rattigan (born July 20, 1937, in Boston) is an American businessman.

== Early life ==
Rattigan earned a BS at Boston College in 1960 and an MBA at Harvard Business School in 1962. He joined PepsiCo in 1970 where he rose to the position of CEO of PepsiCo International in 1982.

In 1985 Commodore, an early producer of home computers, hired Rattigan as COO intending to prepare him to become CEO (competitor Apple Computer had hired Pepsi president John Sculley in 1983).

In 1986 Rattigan took over as CEO from Marshall F. Smith. He continued the downsizing his predecessor had initiated, cut unprofitable product lines and initiated the development of two more models of Commodore's flagship Amiga 1000 computer.

Despite turning the company from a US$237 million three-quarter loss to a $22 million profit in one quarter, Rattigan was fired by major shareholder Irving Gould, who took over as CEO. Rattigan sued Commodore for $9 million of lost income, due to the breach of contract. Rattigan won the suit.

In 1991 Rattigan was appointed by the court as CEO of G. Heileman Brewing Co. He steered the company through bankruptcy and left in 1994, pocketing almost $20 million in severance pay. "You can't say he did a terrible job with Heileman. But he certainly didn't turn it around", PaineWebber analyst Goldman told the Wall Street Journal in 1996.

In 1996 and 1997 Rattigan headed financier Carl Icahn's slate for the RJR Nabisco board, netting him $2 million in salary.
