= Commodore IBM PC compatible systems =

Series of personal computer

The Commodore PC compatible systems are a range of IBM PC compatible personal computers introduced in 1984 by home computer manufacturer Commodore Business Machines.

Although they were incompatible with Commodore 64 and Amiga architectures, they were generally regarded as standard functional PCs without standout features. However the well-established Commodore brand provided a market advantage.

== History ==
In 1984, Commodore signed a deal with Intel to second source manufacture the Intel 8088 CPU used in the IBM PC, along with a license to manufacture a computer based on the Dynalogic Hyperion. It is unknown whether any of these systems were produced or sold.

In 1984, the first model released, the PC-10, sold for $559 without monitor ($1584 in 2025). They were sold alongside Commodore's Amiga and Commodore 64c/128 lines of home and graphics computers. The PC10 was comparable in the market to the Blue Chip PC, Leading Edge Model D and Tandy 1000 line of PC compatibles.

== Models ==
The line consists of the following models: Series 1

=== First generation – Series I ===
Commodore PC 5

- Introduced in 1984, at $1395, the Commodore PC 5 is the low-budget option with a Hercules monochrome video card. It has a Intel 8088 running at 4.77 MHz and 256 KB RAM on-board (expandable to 640 KB). RS232 serial and Centronics parallel printer ports are on the motherboard rather than on separate cards thereby making more slots available. It has one 5.25-inch floppy drive and no hard disk (can be installed). The PC 5 was released with MS-DOS 2.11 and GW Basic 3.2. The PC 5 had 5× 8-bit PC BUS Slots. It has two motherboards. One contains the CPU, RAM and ROM v. 2.01, an NPU socket and some VLSI chips. The second mainboard is connected by gold pin connectors, it is an "I/O board" containing serial and parallel port, ISA slots and all I/O chips. Some tracks from ISA slots are factory cut by drilling. The early PC5 has no RTC, HDD controller or reset switch, in front it has a DIN keyboard connector.

Commodore PC 10

- The Commodore PC 10 is a same as a PC 5, but with added color ATI video card and two 5.25-inch floppy drives.

Commodore PC 10-1

- a 512 KB RAM and single floppy drive version. Price: $519

Commodore PC 10-2

- 640 KB RAM and dual floppy drives. Price: $619

Commodore PC 10-S

- a PC 10 with a single floppy drive. (PC 10 have two floppy drives.)

Commodore PC 20

- The Commodore PC 20 is a PC 10 with a 20 MB hard drive and only one floppy drive.

Commodore PC 40

- PC 40 is the top model of the first generation Commodore PC’s with improved 16-bit "AT" hardware compared to 8-bit XT in the others. It had a Intel 80286 that runs at either 6 or 10 MHz choosable by the user. Standard RAM was 1 MB and the video card was the same as in the PC 10 and 20. It had one 1.2 MB HD 5.25-inch drive and a 20 MB hard drive. The cabinet had a key lock switch added Notes: The "PC AT" is a "PC 40" with a "AT" added to the name.

Commodore PC AT

- The "PC AT" is a "PC 40" with a "AT" added to the name.

Commodore PC 40-40

- The Commodore PC 40-40 is a PC 40 with a 40 MB hard drive and two 5.25-inch floppy drives.

=== Second generation – Series II ===
Commodore PC 10-II

- The Commodore PC 10-II is a minor revision of the original PC 10. It have mainly the same specifications and casing, but the main difference is that it has a new revised single motherboard opposed to the original PC 10 that have two motherboards combined. As the original PC 10, it comes with dual floppy drives and no hard drive.
- The Commodore PC 20-II is a PC 10-II with one floppy drive and one hard drive.

PC 20-III – A PC 10-III-derived system incorporating a hard disk.

=== Third generation – Series III ===
Commodore PC I

- The Commodore PC 1 is a special small form factor PC inspired by the design of the Commodore 128, meant for budget homes or office use. The PC 1 has no internal room for Harddisk, the "PC 1-20" Harddrive came with a 3.5-inch 20 MB hard drive and can be connected to the expansion port. The machine can also be expanded with the "PC 1-NET" which added a Novell Ethernet 10-Mbit card connected to the expansion port. There is no internal sound, but an 8 ohm speaker can be added. There was also an expansion box for connection 3 ISA cards.
- Expansion slots: Commodore "PCEXP1" is a special expansion cabinet made for PC1. this gives 3 additional ISA Slots plus an extra 5.25-inch drive.

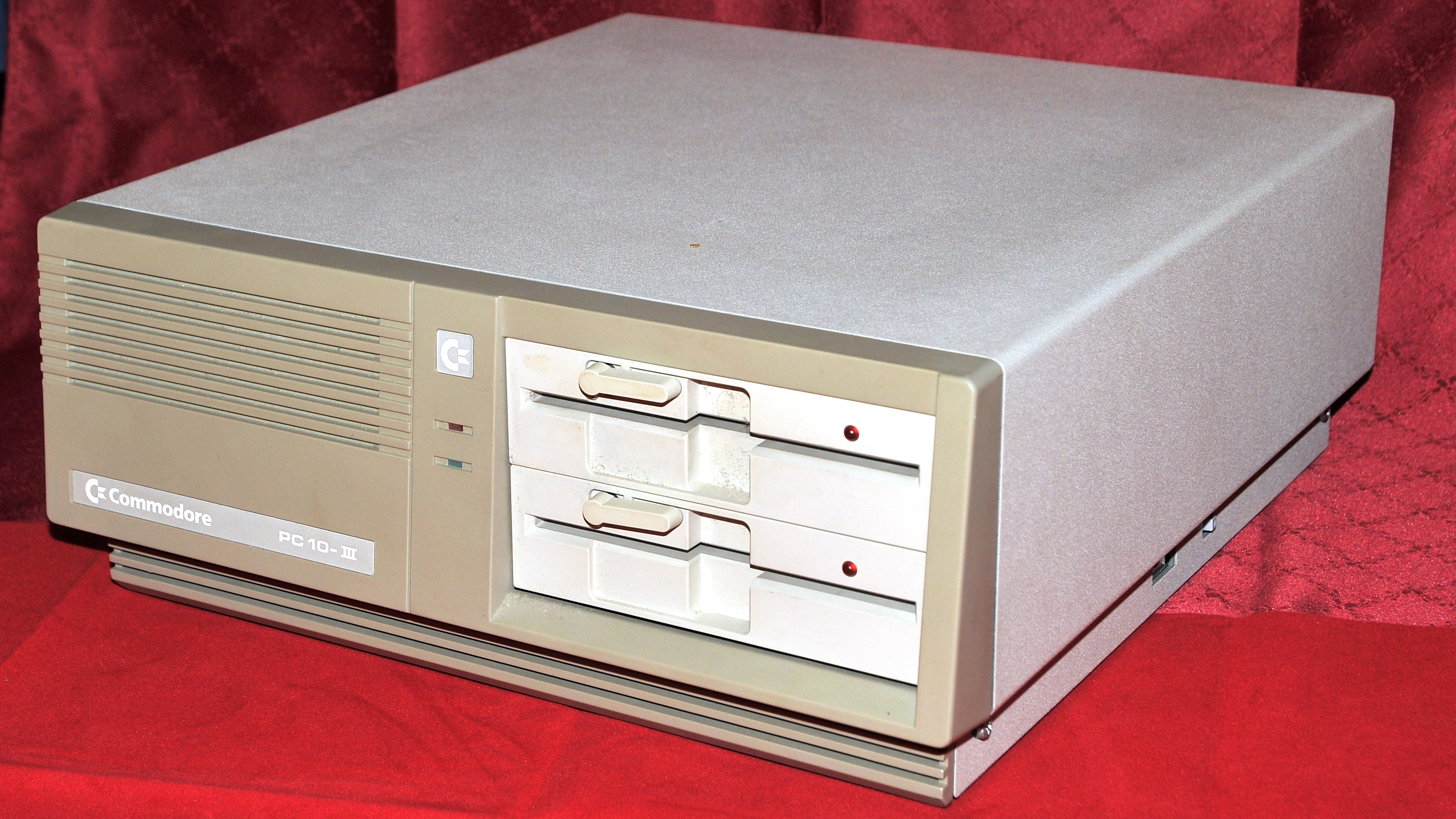
A Commodore PC 10-III

Commodore PC 10-III

- The Commodore PC 10-III is a complete revision of the PC 10 and 10-II machine. It has a new sleeker cabinet and better specifications. While the two generations before only went at 4.77 MHz, the new III series uses an 8088-1 CPU capable of 10 MHz speeds. The PC 10-III/Colt Faraday FE2010 chip-set allows the CPU speed to be adjustable via a SPEED.EXE utility via DOS or through keyboard commands. The default is the standard 4.77 MHz but the speed is adjustable to 7.16 MHz and 9.54 MHz. Being still a 8-bit machine, it has more standard RAM and a better video card. It came with two floppy drives.

Commodore COLT

- An American version of the PC 10-III with slightly different front design. The front is a white variant of the PC 30-III front with the COLT logo on.

Commodore PC 10-III SD

- a PC 10-III with one floppy drive. (PC 10-III have two floppy drives.)

Commodore PC 20-III

- Same as PC 10-III but with a 20 MB HDD added.

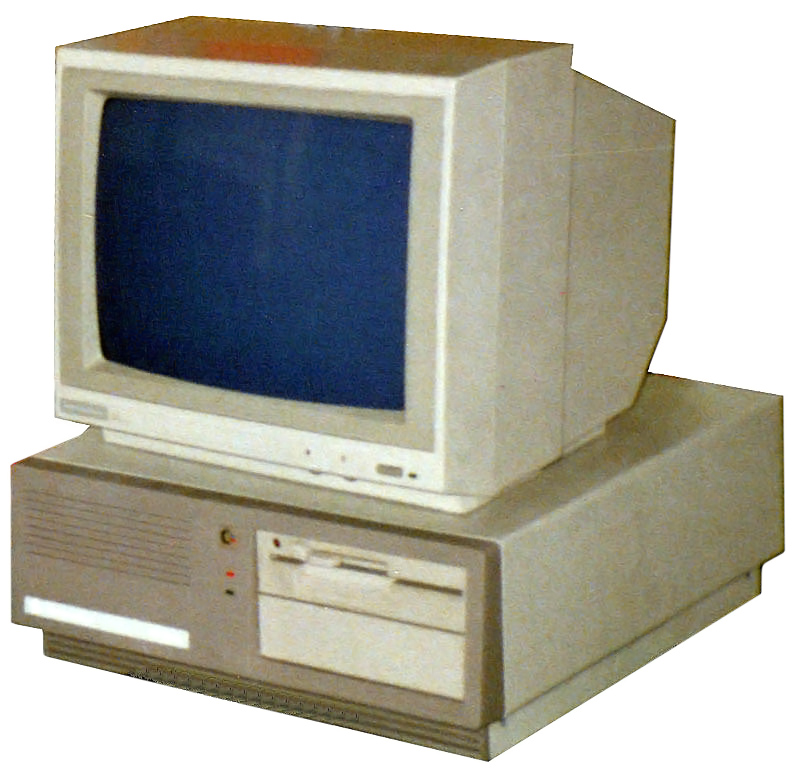
A Commodore PC 20-III

Commodore PC 30-III (also sold as Select Edition 286)

- The commodore PC 30-III is a new generation AT machine with a EGA video card, a 3.5-inch floppy drive and a 20 MB hard disk. The PC-30-III motherboard is the same as the PC40-III MB but with the VGA hardware missing from the Motherboard (it is empty space on the motherboard for the VGA hardware).

Commodore PC 35-III

- PC-35-III is a PC 30-III but with VGA hardware added to the mainboard and the same 20 MB hard disk as PC 30-III.

Commodore PC 40-III

- PC 40-III is same as PC35-III, but with a 40 MB Hard disk.

Commodore PC 45-III

- Same as PC-40-III but with an AMD equipped CPU instead of Intel in the PC-40-III.

Commodore PC 50-II

- The Commodore budget 386 machine. it could be delivered with 40 or 100 MB Hard disk or a 3.5-inch floppy. Comes with SVGA.

Commodore PC 60-III

- a top-of-the-line tower PC for professional use.
- Price: ?
- CPU: Intel 386DX 25 MHz
- Optional CPU: A 387 FPU can be added.
- Standard RAM: 2 MB onboard RAM
- Optional RAM: upgradeable to 18 MB RAM via two expansion cards with max 8 MB on each card.
- Video Card: Paradise 88 VGA card
- Floppy Drive: One Chinon FB-357 1.44 MB 3.5-inch and one Chinon FZ-506 1.2 MB 5.25-inch floppy drive.
- Hard drive: Comes with different choices of hard drive from 60 MB to 200 MB hard disk.
- Expansion Bays: 4× 5.25-inch bay and 2× 3.5-inch bay.
- Expansion Slots: 7× 16-bit AT expansion slots + 2× Commodore Slots for memory card. 9 total.

=== Generation 4 "SlimLine" series ===
Commodore 286 SX

- Price:
- Description: Slimline computer case
- Motherboard year: 1991
- Processor: Intel 80286 running at 8/16 MHz. (A 80287-16 FPU can be added to an empty slot.)
- ROM: 64 KB Phoenix BIOS
- RAM: 1 MB onboard standard, expandable to 5 MB
- Video Card: VGA 256 KB, expandable to 512 KB
- Disk drive: 1× Chinon F-502L 360k 5.25-inch drive. (Optional 720k Commodore 1010 or 1011 can be added to the Amiga style Disk port on the right side)
- Harddrive: 40 MB – (313241-02), 50 MB - (311839-01) and 100 MB – (311840-01)
- Network: "PC 1-NET" came with a Novell Ethernet 10-bit card connected to the expansion port
- Options: Expansion box for connection ISA cards and Harddrive. an additional 8 ohm speaker can be added for sound.
- Operating System: MS-DOS 3.20 and GW-BASIC
- Ports: VGA, component video, RSR-232 serial port, Centronic parallel port.
- Expansion slots: 16-bit ×1 (expandable to 16-bit ×3 + 8-bit 2 by use of riser card)
- Keyboard: 84-key XT keyboard
- Cabinet: Special small form factor inspired by the 128C

Commodore 286-16

- A 16 MHz 286 with 1 MB RAM, VGA video card, 3.5-inch floppy drive and 2× AT 16-bit expansion slots.

Commodore 386SX-16

- A 16 MHz 386 with 1 MB RAM, VGA graphics card, 3.5-inch floppy drive and 5× 16-bit ISA expansion slots.

Commodore 386SX-25

- A 25 MHz 386 with a Cyrix 387 FPU, 4 MB RAM, Cirrus Logic GD-5402 VGA (512 KB video RAM), 40 MB HDD, 3.5-inch floppy drive and 5× 16-bit ISA expansion slots.

Commodore 386DX-33

- A 33 MHz 386 CPU

Commodore 486SX-25

- A 25 MHz 486 with 4 MB RAM, VGA video, 1× 3.5-inch drive and a 150 MB HDD

Commodore 486DX-33

- CPU: 33 MHz 486 with
- RAM: 8 MB RAM,
- Video Card: VGA video,
- Floppy drive: 1× 3.5-inch
- Harddisk: 150 MB HDD

=== Laptops ===
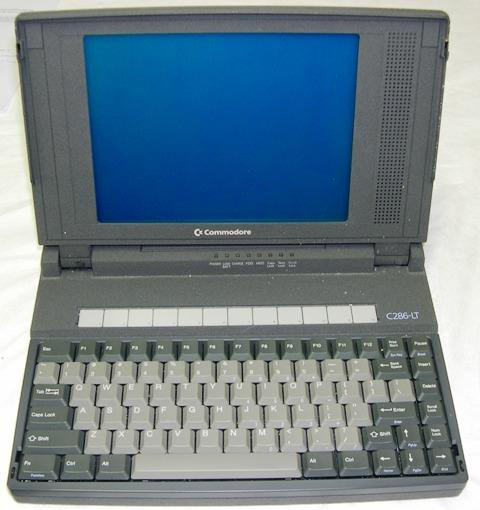
Commodore C286-LT laptop

Commodore C286SX-LT

- a 12 MHz 286 with 1 MB RAM

Commodore C386SX-LT

- a 386 with 2 MB RAM and a 40 MB HDD

== Model table ==
The following table lists all Commodore PC compatible systems specifications:

Commodore IBM PC compatibles
Model	Motherboard Year	Price	CPU		Co-Processor	Chipset	Battery	RAM			Video Card				Floppy Drive		Expansion bay		Harddisk	ISA bus		Keyboard	OS	Ports	Power supply	Size
Model	Motherboard Year	Price	Model	MHZ	Co-Processor	Chipset	Battery	Base	Expansion	Maximum	Name	Modes	RAM	Ideal monitor	5.25-inch	3.5-inch	5.25-inch	3.5-inch	Harddisk	8-bit XT PC	16-bit AT	Keyboard	OS	Ports	Power supply	Size
PC 1	1987	£315, FIM 3.950,- without screen (1988)	Siemens Intel 8088	4.77 MHz	Intel 8087			512 KB	4x 32 KB RAM	640 KB	WD Integrated Paradise PVS 2	MDA, CGA, Hercules, Plantronics		Commodore 1450	Chinon F-502L 360k	Optional C-1010 or C-1011 can be added at the Amiga style disk port on the right side	1	-	The optional 20 MB "PC 1-20" Hard drive can be connected to the expansion port.	1x PCEXP1	-	PC/XT 88-key	MS-DOS 3.1	Power, CGA, component video, RSR-232 serial, Centronic parallel		326 × 330 × 85 mm
PC 5	1984	3.950,- without screen (1988)	Intel 8088	4.77 MHz	Intel 8087			256 KB	384 KB	640 KB	Hercules GB-101 MDPA	MDA		1901	ALPS DFC222A 360 KB	no	2		no	5	-	PC/XT 88-key	MS-DOS 2.11	Centronic parallel		390 × 360 × 150 mm
PC 10	1984	$1,395	Intel 8088	4.77 MHz	Intel 8087			256 KB	384 KB	640 KB	ATI CW16800-A	MDA, CGA, HGC & Plantronics	64 KB		2× ALPS DFC222A 360 KB	no	2		no	5	-	PC/XT 88-key	MS-DOS 2.11	Centronic parallel		390 × 360 × 150 mm
PC 10-II	1985	$559(1988) / NOK 18000,-	Intel 8088	4.77 MHz	Intel 8087			256 KB	384 KB	640 KB	ATI CW16800-A	MDA, CGA, HGC & Plantronics	64 KB	1084	2× Chinon FZ-502LII 360k	no			no	5	-	PC/XT 88-key		Centronic parallel		390 × 360 × 150 mm
PC 10-III / COLT	1989	$1,200/ DM 4.950, FIM 14.950,- (1986)	Siemens Intel 8088-1	Standard 4.77 MHz Turbo 7.16 MHz Double 9.54 MHz	Intel 8087-1	Faraday FE2010A		640 KB			WD Paradise PVC4	MDA, CGA, Hercules, Plantronics		1084	2× Chinon F-502L 360 KB	no	2		optional	3	-	PC/XT 88-key	MSDOS 3.3	Centronic parallel		
PC 20	1984	FIM 7.995,- (1988)	Intel 8088	4.77 MHz	Intel 8087			256 KB	384 KB	640 KB	ATI CW16800-A	MDA, CGA, HGC & Plantronics	64 KB		ALPS DFC222A 360 KB	no	2		20 MB	5	-	PC/XT 88-key	MS-DOS 2.11	Centronic parallel		390 × 360 × 150 mm
PC 20-II	1985	£999 (Aug 1988); NOK 30000,-	Intel 8088	4.77 MHz	Intel 8087			256 KB	384 KB	640 KB	ATI CW16800-A	MDA, CGA, HGC & Plantronics	64 KB		1x Chinon FZ-502LII 360k	no			20 MB	5	-	PC/XT 88-key				390 × 360 × 150 mm
PC 20-III	1989	FIM 23.550,- (1986)	Siemens Intel 8088-1	Standard 4.77 MHz Turbo 7.16 MHz Double 9.54 MHz	Intel 8087-1	Faraday FE2010A		640 KB			WD Paradise PVC4	MDA, CGA, Hercules, Plantronics	64 KB	1084	Chinon F-502L 360k	-	2		WD 20 MB HDD	3	-	PC/XT 88-key	MSDOS 3.3	Centronic parallel		
PC 30-III / Select Edition 286	1989	FIM 14.995,- (1988)	Intel 80286	12 MHz	Intel 80287	Faraday FE3020	Dallas DS1287	640 KB			ATI EGA Wonder 800+	MDA, CGA, EGA & Hercules	256 KB		Chinon FZ-506 1.2 MB	Chinon FB-357 1.44 MB	2		WD 93028 AD 20 MB 68 ms	1	3	PC/AT 102-key	MS DOS 4,01	Centronic parallel	112 W	366 × 381 × 146 mm
PC 35-III	1989	FIM 14.950,- without screen (1989)	Siemens Intel 80286	12 MHz	Intel 80287	Faraday FE3020	Dallas DS1287	640 KB			Paradise 88 PVGA1A-JK	VGA	256 KB		Chinon FZ-506 1.2 MB	Chinon FB-357 1.44 MB	2		WD 93028 A 20 MB	1	3	PC/AT 102-key	MS DOS 4,01	Centronic parallel	112 W	366 × 381 × 146 mm
PC 40 / AT	1987		Intel 80286	6/10 MHz	Intel 80287			512 KB	512 KB	1 MB	ATI CW16800-A	MDA, CGA, HGC & Plantronics	64 KB	1084	1x 1.2 MB 5.25-inch		2		20 MB	6	2	PC/XT 88-key	MS-DOS 3.20	Centronic parallel		
PC 40-20	1988	£2,247 (Feb 1987)	Intel 80286	6/10 MHz	Intel 80287			1 MB	15 MB	16 MB	ATI CW16800-A	MDA, CGA, HGC & Plantronics	64 kB		1x 1.2 MB 5.25-inch	option			20 MB			PC/XT 88-key	MS-DOS 3.21			
PC 40-40	1988	FIM 24.500,- without screen (1986)	Intel 80286	6/10 MHz	Intel 80287			1 MB	15 MB	16 MB	ATI EGA Wonder (800)	MDA, CGA, EGA	256 KB		1x 1.2 MB 5.25-inch	option			40 MB			PC/XT 88-key	MS-DOS 3.21			
PC 40-III	1989	26.080,- without screen (1987)	Intel 80286	12 MHz	Intel 80287	Faraday FE3020	Dallas DS1287	1 MB		1 MB		VGA (256 KB RAM)			Chinon FZ-506 1.2 MB	Chinon FB-357 1.44 MB	2		40 MB			PC/AT 102-key		Centronic parallel	112 W	
PC 45-III	1989	FIM 21.500,- (1989)	AMD N80L 268-12/S	12 MHz	Intel 80287	Faraday FE3020	Dallas DS1287	1 MB	2 MB		VGA	VGA (256 KB RAM)			Chinon FZ-506 1.2 MB	Chinon FB-357 1.44 MB	2		52 MB			PC/AT 102-key	MS DOS 4,01	Centronic parallel	112 W	381 × 146 × 356 mm
PC 50-II	1989		Intel 80386 SX	16 MHz	Intel 80387			1 MB	15 MB	16 MB	Paradise 88 PVGA1A-JK	MDA, CGA, EGA, VGA	256 KB		1× 1.2 MB Chinon FR-506	1.44 MB	2	1	40 MB Conner CP-3044 or 100 MB option.	1	5	PC/AT 102-key	MS DOS 4,01	Power, Printer parallel, 2× RS232C, VGA	145 W	377 × 158 × 421 mm
PC 50-III	1991	FIM 22.850,- (1990)	Intel 386	25 MHz				1 MB				SVGA			no	1			200 MB	0	5		Windows 3.1			
PC 60-40	1988		Intel 386	8 / 16 MHz	Intel 80387			2.5 MB	13.5 MB	16 MB		MDA, Hercules, CGA, EGA			1x 1.2 MB 5.25-inch	option	2	-	40 MB	2	4	PC/AT 102-key		2× RS232C, 2× Centronics parallel	170 W	
PC 60-80	1988	FIM 36.480,- (1988)	Intel 386	8 / 16 MHz	Intel 80387			2.5 MB	13.5 MB	16 MB		MDA, Hercules, CGA, EGA					2	-	80 MB	2	4	PC/AT 102-key			170 W	
PC 60-III	1990	£3,999 (40 MB HDD), £4,999 (80 MB HDD) FIM 45.500,- (1990)	Intel 80386DX	25 MHz	Intel 80387			2 MB	16 MB	18 MB	Paradise 88 VGA	MDA, Hercules, CGA VGA			Chinon FZ-506 1.2 MB	Chinon FB-357 1.44 MB	4	2		-	7	PC/AT 102-key		Centronic parallel		

== See also ==
- 3D Microcomputers, a Canadian computer manufacturer whom Commodore Canada authorized to produce PC clones bearing the Commodore label shortly before Commodore International's bankruptcy in 1994
