= Beyond (Canadian TV series) =

- Created by: Steven Rumbelow
- Starring: Alannah Myles
- Country of origin: Canada
- No. of episodes: 52

Production
- Running time: approx. 30 minutes

Original release
- Network: Space
- Release: January 2005 – March 2007

Beyond is a Canadian paranormal documentary television series created by Steven Rumbelow and produced by Renegade Motion Pictures. The show premiered on Space and ran from 2005 to 2007. Robin Poitras was the hostess in seasons one and two, and Alannah Myles took on the role for seasons three and four. Episodes have been available on Hulu, Amazon Video, YouTube on Demand, and various other digital platforms.

The show uses interviews with eyewitness, well-respected academics, such as physicists, and paranormal practitioners, such as shamans to investigate orbs, ghosts, EVP, alternative healing, and other paranormal subjects. It was developed as a follow-up to Steven Rumbelow's 90-minute documentary called Ghosts which also aired on Space.

Every season of Beyond has a main theme, and the last episode of each season is a conclusions episode that includes a summary and a round-table discussion with the experts and practitioners from the season.

== Episodes ==
=== Season I (2005) ===
Episode #	Original air date (Space)	Episode title
I / 01	12 January 2005	"Ghosts"
I / 02	19 January 2005	"Poltergeists"
I / 03	26 January 2005	"Hauntings"
I / 04	2 February 2005	"Beyond Death"
I / 05	9 February 2005	"The Predatory Universe"
I / 06	16 February 2005	"Signs"
I / 07	23 February 2005	"Earth Signs"
I / 08	2 March 2005	"Heaven"
I / 09	9 March 2005	"Healing"
I / 10	16 March 2005	"Healing Part II"
I / 11	23 March 2005	"Supernature"
I / 12	30 March 2005	"Prophecy"
I / 13	6 April 2005	"Conclusions I"

=== Season II (2005) ===
Episode #	Original Air Date (Space)	Episode Title
II / 14	13 April 2005	"Cults"
II / 15	20 April 2005	"Ghost Hunters"
II / 16	27 April 2005	"EVPs"
II / 17	5 May 2005	"Upstairs"
II / 18	11 May 2005	"Psychics"
II / 19	18 May 2005	"NDEs"
II / 20	25 May 2005	"Tesla"
II / 21	1 June 2005	"Shamans"
II / 22	8 June 2005	"Exorcism"
II / 23	15 June 2005	"Witchcraft"
II / 24	22 June 2005	"Spells"
II / 25	29 June 2005	"Mind Control"
II / 26	6 July 2005	"Conclusions II"

=== Season III (2006) ===
Episode #	Original Air Date (Space)	Episode Title
III / 27	23 September 2006	"Channeling"
III / 28	30 September 2006	"Supernatural Predators"
III / 29	7 October 2006	"Body Memories"
III / 30	14 October 2006	"Haunted Objects"
III / 31	21 October 2006	"Thought"
III / 32	28 October 2006	"Sexual Demons"
III / 33	4 November 2006	"New Order"
III / 34	11 November 2006	"Pyramids"
III / 35	18 November 2006	"Fortean Mysteries"
III / 36	25 November 2006	"Coral Castle"
III / 37	2 December 2006	"Cattle Mutilations"
III / 38	9 December 2006	"Brews & Potions"
III / 39	16 December 2006	"Conclusions III"

=== Season IV (2007) ===
Episode #	Original Air Date (Space)	Episode Title
IV / 40	12 December 2006	"Old Father Christmas"
IV / 41	30 December 2006	"The Holy Grail"
IV / 42	6 January 2007	"Da Vinci Code"
IV / 43	13 January 2007	"The Masons"
IV / 44	20 January 2007	"Vampires"
IV / 45	27 January 2007	"Elementals"
IV / 46	3 February 2007	"Triangles"
IV / 47	10 February 2007	"Reincarnation"
IV / 48	17 February 2007	"Monsters"
IV / 49	24 February 2007	"The Spear of Destiny"
IV / 50	3 March 2007	"Death"
IV / 51	10 March 2007	"The Final Myth"
IV / 52	17 March 2007	"Conclusions IV"

== Home media ==
DVDs of each season were available for a time to purchase through the television show's official website.
