= Steven Rumbelow =

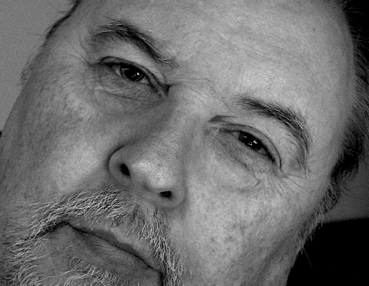
- Born: 30 July 1949; Bristol, UK
- Died: 27 February 2016 (aged 66); Toronto, Ontario, Canada
- Occupations: Director, screenwriter, producer, editor
- Years active: 1965–2016
- Spouse: Rachel Rumbelow (2006–2016; his death)
- Children: 3, including Dickon Tolson

Steven Rumbelow (also credited as Steve Rumbelow, 30 July 1949 − 27 February 2016), was a director in the entertainment industry for more than four decades. He began in theatre at the Bristol Old Vic, subsequently becoming the youngest director for the Royal Shakespeare Company in London before forming Triple Action Theatre and then later starting on films. His career has been a melange between media productions and theatre ever since. Rumbelow operated his own production company in Toronto, Ontario, Canada, Renegade Motion Pictures, with his wife, Rachel, until his sudden death from sepsis on 27 February 2016.

== Early life ==
Rumbelow was born in Bristol on 30 July 1949. His mother was Rita Rumbelow, who later became a costume designer and wardrobe mistress with the BBC. His father was Mike Marino, a professional wrestler. At age 16 he took a summer job as a stagehand at the Bristol Old Vic and was promoted to technical stage manager within six weeks. He started directing professionally the following year.

== Theatre ==
With his career in theatre started at Bristol Old Vic he moved to London aged eighteen and worked with an experimental unit of the Royal Shakespeare Company. He adapted Christopher Marlowe's Dr. Faustus into a 60-minute play that was so successful; he began the show in 1971 and toured all over the world with it until the late nineties. Rumbelow has directed around 150 theatre productions around the world and has written for the stage, screen and television. He founded Triple Action Company, one of the world's foremost physical theatre companies, and was involved with the Company for fourteen years.

Following a move to Canada he started a post-graduate improvisation program at York University in Toronto. Establishing contacts throughout North America, he also worked extensively as a director in Chicago.

== Film ==
Renegade Motion Pictures was founded by Rumbelow and credits include feature films, television, commercials and music videos.

== Renegade filmography ==
- Autumn – 2009 – adapted from the novel by David Moody
- Beyond, The Series – 2005–2007 – currently airing on Space
- The Deed (previously titled The Covenant) – (post-production) 2007
- Lost Souls – (post-production) 2007
- Queen City Blowout – (re-release) 2007
- Rocking Horse Dreams – (full-length documentary) – 2004
- Ghosts – (90 minute documentary) 1998 – aired on Space
- The Proteus Chronicles – (feature film) 1999

== Independent filmography ==
- King Lear – (feature film) 1976
- Saint Joan – (feature film) 1977
- Faust – (feature film) 1980
