= 3D Microcomputers =

Canadian computer company

3D Microcomputers Wholesale and Distribution, Inc.
- Company type: Private
- Industry: Electronics
- Founded: 1985; 41 years ago in Markham, Ontario
- Defunct: 2017; 9 years ago
- Fate: Dissolved
- Key people: David Wong, CEO
- Products: Computers
- Number of employees: 500 (2001)

3D Microcomputers Wholesale and Distribution, Inc., often referred to as 3D Microcomputers or 3D Micro, was a computer company based in Markham, Ontario. The company was among the top five personal computer vendors in Canada in the mid-1990s. The company was partially owned by Hong Kong–based computer manufacturer PC Chips for several years; many of the parts for 3D Micro's computers were of overseas origin.

== History ==
3D Microcomputers Wholesale and Distribution was founded in Markham, Ontario in 1985. By 1990, the company had offices across six cities in Canada, including Markham, with plans to open a seventh office that year, although the plans had stalled by 1992. By 1994, the company employed 120 people, 100 residing in Canada. David Wong served as the company's chief executive officer. He was simultaneously the vice chairman of PC Chips, a Hong Kong–based motherboard and peripheral manufacturer; PC Chips had partial ownership of 3D Microcomputers. The company's Evertek Manufacturing subsidiary performed the manufacturing of the company's products, which 3D Microcomputers marketed under the IPC trademark.

In December 1993, the company won a contract to manufacture and sell IBM PC clone computers for Commodore International's Canadian subsidiary. Commodore left the PC clone market earlier in 1993; Commodore Canada previously contracted 3D Microcomputers in 1991 for the manufacturing of Commodore's line of enterprise computers. Commodore Canada was set to refocus on marketing its Amiga computers and the heretofore recently released Amiga CD32 home game console for 1994, while 3D Microcomputers would handle development of MS-DOS computers with Commodore badging. 3D Microcomputers turned to Xylog of Richmond Hill, Ontario, to market these PC-based Commodore computers in the public sector, while 3D Micro themselves would handle marketing in the retail and educational sectors, which were formerly handled by Commodore. The initial lineup of 3D Micro–built Commodore PCs comprised three systems each aimed at multimedia PC, SOHO, and workstation buyers.

In April 1994, Commodore International went bankrupt and announced that liquidation proceedings were imminent. Despite the company's financial woes in the United States, the Canadian subsidiary had been relatively profitable, and 3D Microcomputers declared that they would continue selling computers under the Commodore brand for the foreseeable future. In June 1994, 3D Microcomputers formed a subsidiary, CBM Computers Inc., to handle the marketing and distribution of its Commodore-branded PCs. On its formation, the subsidiary announced a Commodore-branded sound card and fax modem. Citing continuing good sales, 3D Microcomputers and its CBM subsidiary kept manufacturing and marketing Commodore-branded computers and peripherals into 1995, making these machines the last Commodore-branded computers authorized while Commodore was still a going concern. Germany-based Escom purchased the majority of Commodore's inventory, intellectual property, and trademarks in July 1995. Despite this, 3D Micro announced that they would continue marketing computers under the Commodore name, according to spokesperson Lorne Matheson, "[u]ntil we're told that we cannot do it".

By the end of 1994, the company was one of the top five personal computer vendors in Canada, according to Evans Research Associates. The company expanded to 300 people worldwide in 1995 and posted sales of CA$98.5 million, up from CA$58.8 million in 1994. Sales dropped to CA$47.3 million in 1996; the company's sales held steady at CA$52.5 million between 1997 and 1998. Sales rose to CA$87.5 million in 1999, and the company expanded to 300 employees in Canada and 500 abroad; sales again held steady between 2000 and 2001.

3D Microcomputers filed its last financial statement in 2017.
