= Autumn (2009 film) =

- Directed by: Steven Rumbelow
- Screenplay by: Steven Rumbelow; David Moody
- Based on: Autumn by David Moody
- Produced by: Anton Brejak; John Dunlop; Steven Rumbelow; Matthew Stone; Michael Summerfield
- Starring: Dexter Fletcher; Dickon Tolson; David Carradine; Anton Brejak; Lana Kamenov; Jody Willis
- Cinematography: Stephen Crone
- Edited by: Steven Rumbelow; Anthony Valenti
- Music by: 615; Craig McConnell
- Production company: Renegade Motion Pictures
- Release date: May 30, 2009
- Running time: 110 minutes
- Country: Canada
- Language: English

Autumn is a 2009 Canadian horror film directed by Steven Rumbelow, written by David Moody and Rumbelow, and starring Dexter Fletcher. It was based on Moody's self-published novel Autumn. Fletcher plays a schoolteacher who must survive in a post-apocalyptic world inhabited by evolving zombies. This was the final film of David Carradine released before his death.

== Premise ==
After a viral outbreak kills 99% of the world's population, scattered survivors come together and attempt to deal with the collapse of civilization. They face a new threat when the dead begin to reanimate. Initially catatonic, the corpses slowly regain their senses, become increasingly sensitive to outside stimuli, and show signs of aggression. Eventually, the survivors must fortify themselves against attack and try to find a reason to survive.

== Cast ==
- Dexter Fletcher as Michael
- Dickon Tolson as Carl
- Lana Kamenov as Emma
- Anton Brejak as Kyle
- David Carradine as Phillip
- Jody Willis as Jeffries

== Production ==
Author David Moody had offers on two of his novels, Autumn and Hater, at the same time. Although Hater had Guillermo del Toro attached, Moody reasoned that Autumn, as a small independent film, had a greater chance of being made. Moody made both deals and participated in the making of Autumn.

== Release ==
Autumn played at the 2009 Grimm Up North Festival in the UK.

== Reception ==
The film drew mixed to negative reviews. Reviewing the film while it was still in post-production, Brutal As Hell wrote that the atmosphere and settings of the film are better than other low budget post-apocalyptic films. Sabrina Bangladesh of Shadowlocked.com wrote that the film is too boring to be "so bad it's good". Mark L. Miller of Ain't It Cool News called it "a thinking man's zombie flick with some fun performances and decent effects." Writing in The Zombie Movie Encyclopedia, Volume 2, academic Peter Dendle called the film "a patient meditation" with a "mournful, serious tone" and "rich aesthetic to many of the scenes."

David Moody, the author of the source novel, said, "Ultimately, although it has some redeeming qualities, and the main cast did a great job, I think it was a disappointment to a lot of people. The filmmakers were really stretched by having to work within a microscopic budget, and there are places where that really shows." The mostly negative reception of Autumn led Dexter Fletcher to direct his own films, which were better received.
