= Irving Gould =

Canadian businessman

Irving Gould (1919–2004) was a Canadian businessman credited with both saving and sinking Commodore.

Commodore was originally formed in Canada and initially produced mechanical typewriters and calculators. In 1965, Jack Tramiel, Commodore's founder and CEO, decided to purchase the Canadian store chain Wilson's Stationers to provide a sales channel for their products. To fund the purchase they borrowed $3 million from Atlantic Acceptance Corporation at an 11% interest rate. On 14 June 1965, Atlantic bounced a $5 million check and was insolvent within days. This led to all their capital loans being called in, including Commodore's $3 million.

Looking for a way out of the problem, Irving Gould arranged the sale of Wilson's Stationers to a US company. To pay off the bridge loan, Gould purchased 17% of Commodore's stock in 1966 for $400,000. Over the next decade, the company repeatedly had difficulties and repeatedly turned to Gould for funding.

Through the late 1960s and early 1970s, Japanese companies began introducing typewriters and calculators at price points Commodore could not match. Tramiel responded by moving into the newly emerging field of electronic calculators. Gould had a Japanese girlfriend and kept up on changes in Japanese industry. In the mid-1970s, Gould told Tramiel that the Japanese were starting to produce calculators using CMOS electronics that were going to "kick your butt". Tramiel visited Japan to examine their systems, and found they would not sell their technology to the US.

The Japanese companies were able to undercut Commodore both in technology and by being vertically integrated. Texas Instruments, one of Commodore's suppliers, decided to follow this pattern and introduced complete calculators at prices below what they sold the parts to Commodore. Gould provided funding to keep Commodore going during the period where they were being forced out of the calculator business. Tramiel responded by buying MOS Technology to supply microprocessors and moving into the computer market.

In the early 80s Irwin Gould got into a disagreement with Jack Tramiel over how to run the company. In a 1986 interview with Dr. Achim Becker for the German newspaper Data Welt, at the question to Jack Tramiel "Why did you leave Commodore? Is there a simple answer to this question?", Jack answered:

If you ask the people who have worked with me, they will tell you that I have changed virtually nothing in the last 25 years. I've always been one of them. Just because we were a billion-dollar company, we didn't have to throw money out the window like a billion-dollar company. Because, if you spend more, you have to raise prices. The man I worked for disagreed. When business was better, he wanted to spend more. That's one of the points where we disagreed. We also disagreed on the issue of financing. I felt that the moment our stock was trading high, we should have issued new stock; especially since we had never had an increase since we went public in 1962. With the $120 million we would have earned from 2 million new shares, we could have paid all our debts to the banks and strengthened the company's position. It would have allowed us to weather any storm without relying on the banks. The man I worked for thought this would dilute his share in the company and lose influence in the process - that was absolutely wrong. Those were the main reasons. In short, our philosophies were different. It got to the point where I said to him: Either I can run the company the way I think it should be run or I have to leave. I was told very kindly: If you don't want to do it the way I do, then leave. And I left.

Gould and Mehdi Ali (then Commodore's managing director) have also been accused of causing the death of Commodore in 1993–94 by making a series of mistakes like trying to maximize profit by producing low-cost equipment and mismarketing the Amiga.
