= Jack Tramiel =

American businessman and Holocaust survivor (1928–2012)

- Idek Trzmiel
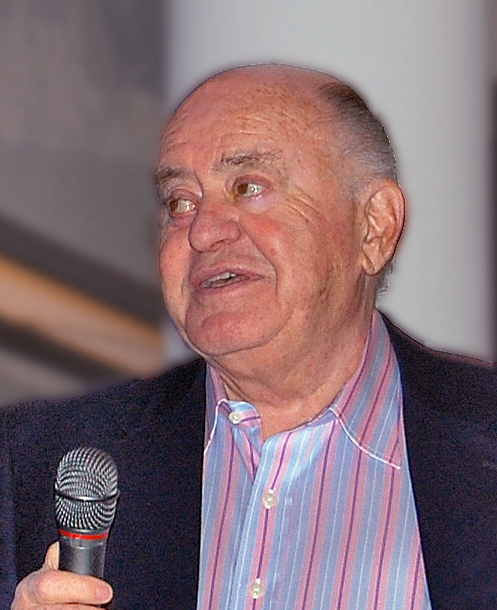
- Tramiel in 2007
- Pronunciation: /ˈdʒæk trəˈmɛl/ [ˈidɛk ˈtʂmjɛl]
- Born: Idek Trzmiel; December 13, 1928; Łódź, Second Polish Republic
- Died: April 8, 2012 (aged 83); Stanford, California, U.S.
- Known for: Holocaust survivor; Founder of Commodore International; Founder and CEO of Atari Corporation
- Spouse: Helen (m. 1947–2012)
- Children: 3

Jack Tramiel (/ˈdʒæk trəˈmɛl/, trə-MEL; born Idek Trzmiel, Polish pronunciation: [ˈidɛk ˈtʂmjɛl]; December 13, 1928 – April 8, 2012) was a Polish-American businessman and Holocaust survivor, best known for founding Commodore International. The PET, VIC-20, and Commodore 64 are some home computers produced while he was running the company. Tramiel later formed Atari Corporation after he purchased the remnants of the original Atari, Inc. from its parent company. He was one of six people spotlighted when the computer was denoted "Machine of the Year" by Time magazine in 1982.

== Early years ==
Tramiel was born as Idek Trzmiel, but some sources also list the name Jacek Trzmiel (the word trzmiel in Polish means bumblebee) into a Jewish family, the son of Abram Josef Trzmiel and Rifka Bentkowska. The whole family lived on A. Napiórkowskiego Street (today S. Przybyszewskiego Street) in Górniak district in Łódź.

After the German invasion of Poland in 1939, his family was transported by Nazi occupiers to the Jewish ghetto in Łódź, where he worked in a garment factory. When the ghettos were liquidated, his family was sent to the Auschwitz concentration camp. He was examined by Josef Mengele and selected for a work party, after which he and his father were sent to the labor camp Ahlem, a satellite camp of Neuengamme concentration camp near Hanover, while his mother remained at Auschwitz. Like many other inmates, his father was reported to have died of typhus in the work camp; however, Tramiel believed he was killed by an injection of gasoline. Tramiel was rescued from the labor camp in April 1945 by the 84th Infantry Division of the U.S. Army.

On November 10, 1947, Tramiel immigrated to the United States. He soon joined the U.S. Army, where he learned how to repair office equipment, including typewriters.

== Commodore ==
=== Typewriters and calculators ===
In 1953, while working as a taxi driver, Tramiel bought a shop in the Bronx to repair office machinery, securing a $25,000 loan for the business from a U.S. Army entitlement. He named it Commodore Portable Typewriter. Tramiel wanted a military-style name for his company, but names such as Admiral and General were already taken, so he settled on the Commodore name.

In 1956, Tramiel signed a deal with Czechoslovak typewriter manufacturer Zbrojovka Brno NP to assemble and sell their typewriters in North America. However, as Czechoslovakia was part of the Warsaw Pact, they could not be imported directly into the U.S., so Tramiel used parts from Zbrojovka's Consul typewriters and set up Commodore Business Machines in Toronto, Canada. After Zbrojovka began developing their own hardware Commodore signed an agreement in 1962 with Rheinmetall-Borsig AG and began to sell Commodore portable typewriters made from the parts of older Rheinmetall-Borsig typewriters. In 1962, Commodore went public, but the arrival of Japanese typewriters in the U.S. market made the selling of Czechoslovak typewriters unprofitable. Struggling for cash, the company sold 17% of its stock to Canadian businessman Irving Gould, taking in $400,000 and using the money to re-launch the company in the adding machine business, which was profitable for a time before the Japanese entered that field as well. Stung twice by the same source, Gould suggested that Tramiel travel to Japan to learn why they were able to outcompete North Americans in their own local markets. It was during this trip that Tramiel saw the first digital calculators, and decided that the mechanical adding machine was a dead end.

When Commodore released its first calculators, combining an LED display from Bowmar and an integrated circuit from Texas Instruments (TI), it found a ready market. However, after slowly realizing the size of the market, TI decided to cut Commodore out of the middle, and released their own calculators at a price point below Commodore's cost of just the chips. Gould once again rescued the company, injecting another $3 million, which allowed Commodore to purchase MOS Technology, Inc. an IC design and semiconductor manufacturer, a company which had also supplied Commodore with calculator ICs. When their lead designer, Chuck Peddle, told Tramiel that calculators were a dead end and computers were the future, Tramiel told him to build one to prove the point.

=== Home computers ===
Peddle responded with the Commodore PET, based on his company's MOS Technology 6502 processor. It was first shown, privately, at the Chicago Consumer Electronics Show in 1977, and soon the company was receiving 50 calls a day from dealers wanting to sell the computer. The PET became a success—especially in the education field, where its all-in-one design was a major advantage. Much of their success with the PET came from the business decision to sell directly to large customers, instead of selling to them through a dealer network. The first PET computers were sold primarily in Europe, where Commodore had also introduced the first wave of digital handheld calculators.

As prices dropped and the market matured, the PET's monochrome monitor (green text on black screen) was at a disadvantage in the market when compared to machines like the Apple II and Atari 8-bit computers, which offered color graphics and could be hooked to a television as an inexpensive display. Commodore responded with the VIC-20, and then the Commodore 64, which became the best-selling home computer of all time. The VIC-20 was the first computer to sell one million units. The Commodore 64 sold several million units. It was during this time that Tramiel coined the phrase, "We need to build computers for the masses, not the classes." An industry executive attributed to Tramiel the discontinuation of the TI-99/4A home computer in 1983, after the company had lost hundreds of millions of dollars, stating that "TI got suckered by Jack". By 1983 Commodore had $1 billion in annual revenue.

=== Departure ===
Gould had controlled the company since 1966. He and Tramiel often argued, but Gould usually let Tramiel run Commodore by himself. Tramiel was considered by many to be a micromanager who did not believe in budgets, viewing them as a "license to steal"; he insisted on approving and personally signing every expense greater than $1,000, which meant that operations stopped when Tramiel went on his frequent business trips and vacations. His management style made it difficult for Commodore to hire and keep executives, but was effective. Adam Osborne wrote in 1981:

The microcomputer industry abounds with horror stories describing the way Commodore treats its dealers and its customers. However, Jack Tramiel has built a large and profitable organization by offering a capable product. Tramiel definitely plays hardball, but he deserves credit for what he has been able to accomplish.

Tramiel angrily left a January 13, 1984 meeting of Commodore's board of directors led by chairman Gould, and never returned to the company. What happened at the board meeting remains unclear, but the departure surprised the industry because of Commodore's great success against competitors. The press reported the poor relationship between Tramiel and Gould as the cause. Neil Harris, editor of Commodore Magazine, recalled:

Well, came that fateful Consumer Electronics Show in January of '84 – a very strange press conference. Jack Tramiel got on stage in front of a whole ballroom full of press people to make the announcement that in the calendar year of 1983, Commodore had sold more than a billion dollars worth of products. Just phenomenal. In three years the company had grown from under $100 million to over a billion dollar corporation. Just unbelievable growth. A success story. But Jack was on stage and he didn't look like a happy man, and Jack was not someone to hide his emotions generally – it just seemed strange for some of us in the back of the room. Three days after the show, Jack announced that he was resigning from the company. Apparently there had been some falling out between him and the chairman of the board, Irving Gould, and from that day on the company was not the same place.

Tramiel said that he had resigned from Commodore because he disagreed with Gould "on the basic principles, how to run the company. And I felt that if I could not go into my office smiling, and being happy, I'd better quit". Their disagreement was so bitter that, after his departure, Commodore Magazine was forbidden to quote Tramiel or mention his name. Ahoy! wrote that although Tramiel's "obsession with controlling the cost of every phase of the manufacturing process" had led to record profits during the home computer price war, his "inflexible one-man rule" had resulted in poor dealer relations and "a steady turnover of top executives at Commodore". The magazine concluded "it has become increasingly clear that the company is just too big for one man, however talented, to run".

During a question and answer session at CommVEx v11 (July 18, 2015), Jack's son, Leonard Tramiel, stated that now that both Irving Gould and his dad Jack were both deceased, he could finally reveal to the crowd what really transpired between Jack and Irving Gould that resulted in Tramiel leaving Commodore: On January 13, 1984 during a meeting with Irving, Jack told Irving that treating the assets of the company as his own and using them for personal use was wrong. He said to Irving, "you can't do that while I'm still president" to which Irving responded by saying "Goodbye". Three days after the show, Jack announced to the public that he was resigning from the company.

Whilst acknowledging this description of events, David Pleasance (the eventual managing director of Commodore UK) also states that Gould told him the falling out was due to Tramiel's insistence on his three sons joining the board.

In a 1986 interview with Dr. Achim Becker for the German newspaper DATA WELT, when asked the question "Why did you leave Commodore? Is there a simple answer to this question?" Jack Tramiel said:

If you ask the people who have worked with me, they will tell you that I have changed virtually nothing in the last 25 years. I've always been one of them. Just because we were a billion-dollar company, we didn't have to throw money out the window like a billion-dollar company. Because, if you spend more, you have to raise prices. The man I worked for disagreed. When business was better, he wanted to spend more. That's one of the points where we disagreed. We also disagreed on the issue of financing. I felt that the moment our stock was trading high, we should have issued new stock; especially since we had never had an increase since we went public in 1962. With the $120 million we would have earned from 2 million new shares, we could have paid all our debts to the banks and strengthened the company's position. It would have allowed us to weather any storm without relying on the banks. The man I worked for thought this would dilute his share in the company and lose influence in the process - that was absolutely wrong. Those were the main reasons. In short, our philosophies were different. It got to the point where I said to him: Either I can run the company the way I think it should be run or I have to leave. I was told very kindly: If you don't want to do it the way I do, then leave. And I left.

In an interview with Fortune magazine on April 13, 1998, Tramiel said "Business is war, I don't believe in compromising, I believe in winning.".

== Atari ==
After a short break from the computer industry, he formed a new company named Tramel Technology, Ltd., in order to design and sell a next-generation home computer. The company was named "Tramel" to help ensure that it would be pronounced correctly (i.e., "tra – mel" instead of "tra – meal").

In July 1984, Tramel Technology bought the Consumer Division of Atari Inc. from Warner Communications. The division had fallen on hard times due to the video game crash of 1983. TTL was then renamed Atari Corporation, and went on to produce the 16-bit Atari ST computer line based on Motorola's 68000 CPU, directly competing with Apple's Macintosh and Commodore's Amiga, which also used the same CPU. Under Tramiel's direction, the Atari ST was a considerable success in Europe, and globally in the professional music market.

Despite successfully shipping the ST, Tramiel's poor personal reputation hurt Atari. One retailer said in 1985 about the ST that because of its prior experience with Tramiel "Our interest in Atari is zero, zilch". A software company executive said "Dealing with Commodore was like dealing with Attila the Hun. I don't know if Tramiel will be following his old habits ... I don't see a lot of people rushing to get software on the machine." (One ex-Commodore employee said that to Tramiel "software wasn't tangible—you couldn't hold it, feel it, or touch it—so it wasn't worth spending money for".) Steve Arnold of LucasArts said after meeting with Tramiel that he reminded him of Jabba the Hutt, while within Atari Darth Vader was often the comparison. Another executive was more positive, stating "Jack Tramiel is a winner. I wouldn't bet against him." In 1988 Stewart Alsop II called Tramiel and Alan Sugar "the world's two leading business-as-war entrepreneurs".

In the late 1980s, Tramiel decided to step away from day-to-day operations at Atari, naming his son, Sam, President and CEO. In 1995, Sam suffered a heart attack, and his father returned to oversee operations. In 1996, Tramiel sold Atari to disk-drive manufacturer Jugi Tandon Storage in a reverse merger deal. The newly merged company was named JTS Corporation, and Tramiel joined the JTS board.

== Later years ==
Michael Tomczyk recalled that when Tramiel asked the German government for financial incentives for Commodore to take over a factory,

The Germans said, "Why should we give you concessions?" to which Jack replied, "You owe it to me – I’m an Auschwitz survivor" – then he added – “Besides, it will be great PR for you." They accepted his logic and gave us the plant which was in Braunschweig, West Germany.
I asked Jack if he held resentment toward the Germans to which he replied, "The German people didn’t kill the Jews. The rules killed the Jews. Germans always follow the rules and if the rules are made by madmen, they still follow the rules." Another time I asked him how he dealt with the memories of Auschwitz and he immediately replied, "I live in the future."

Tramiel was a co-founder of the United States Holocaust Memorial Museum, which was opened in 1993. He was among many other survivors of the Ahlem labor camp who tracked down U.S. Army veteran Vernon Tott, who was among the 84th Division which rescued survivors from the camp and had taken and stored photographs of at least 16 of the survivors. Tott, who died of cancer in 2005, was personally commemorated by Tramiel with an inscription on one of the Holocaust Museum's walls saying "To Vernon W. Tott, My Liberator and Hero".

Tramiel retired in 1996 and moved to Monte Sereno, California. In 2004, for the last time, he visited his Polish hometown, Łódź.

Tramiel died of heart failure in Stanford, California on April 8, 2012, aged 83.
