= Commodore International =

Home computer and electronics manufacturer

Commodore International Corporation
- Type: Public
- Traded as: AMEX: CBU; NYSE: CBU; AMEX: CDRL
- Industry: Electronics; Computer hardware Computer software
- Founded: 1976; 50 years ago Nassau, The Bahamas
- Founders: Jack Tramiel and Irving Gould
- Defunct: May 6, 1994; 32 years ago
- Fate: Chapter 11 bankruptcy and liquidation; inventory and intellectual property acquired by Escom AG on April 22, 1995
- Successor: Escom AG
- Headquarters: 1200 Wilson Drive, West Chester, Pennsylvania, United States
- Area served: Worldwide
- Key people: Jack Tramiel; Irving Gould; (main investor and chairman)
- Products: Commodore PET; VIC-20; Commodore 64; Commodore 16; Commodore 128; Amiga; CD32
- Subsidiaries: Amiga Corporation; Commodore Semiconductor Group

Commodore International Corporation (CI), also known as Commodore International Limited, was a home computer and electronics manufacturer with its head office in The Bahamas and its executive office in the United States. Founded in 1976 by Jack Tramiel and Irving Gould, it was the successor company to Commodore Business Machines (Canada) Ltd., established in 1958 by Tramiel and Manfred Kapp. Commodore International, along with its U.S. subsidiary Commodore Business Machines, Inc. (CBM), was a significant participant in the development of the home computer industry, and at one point in the 1980s was the world's largest in the industry.

The company released its first home computer, the Commodore PET, in 1977; it was followed by the VIC-20, the first ever computer to reach one million units of sales. In 1982, the company developed and marketed the world's best selling computer, the Commodore 64; its success made Commodore one of the world's largest personal computer manufacturers, with sales peaking in the last quarter of 1983 at $49 million (equivalent to $133 million in 2025). However an internal struggle led to co-founder Tramiel quitting, then rivaling Commodore under Atari Corporation joined by a number of other employees. Commodore in 1985 launched the Amiga 1000 personal computer — running on AmigaOS featuring a full color graphical interface and preemptive multitasking — which would initially become a popular platform for computer games and creative software. The company did particularly well in European markets; in West Germany, Commodore machines were ubiquitous as of 1989.

The company's position started declining in the late 1980s amid internal conflicts and mismanagement, and while the Amiga line was popular, newer models failed to keep pace against competing IBM PC-compatibles and Apple Macintosh. By 1992, MS-DOS and 16-bit video game consoles offered by Nintendo and Sega had eroded Amiga's status as a solid gaming platform. Under co-founding chairman Irving Gould and president Mehdi Ali, Commodore filed for bankruptcy on April 29, 1994 and was soon liquidated, with its assets purchased by German company Escom. The Amiga line was revitalized and continued to be developed by Escom until it too went bankrupt, in July 1996. Commodore's computer systems, mainly the C64 and Amiga series, retain a cult following decades after its demise.

Commodore's assets have been passed through various companies since then. After Escom's demise and liquidation, its core assets were sold to Gateway 2000 while the Commodore brand name was eventually passed to Tulip Computers of the Netherlands. The brand remained under ownership by a Dutch company until 2025, when a group of investors purchased the brand and incorporated a new U.S. company called Commodore International.

Gateway 2000 attempted but failed to market a modern Amiga, and eventually sold the copyrights, Amiga trademark and other intellectual properties to Amiga, Inc., while retaining the Commodore patents. The last of the Commodore-Amiga patents (EP0316325B1 for "Cursor controlled user interface system", based on US887053) expired on July 14, 2007. Amiga Corporation owns the Amiga properties since 2019. Hyperion Entertainment of Belgium has continued development of AmigaOS 4 (version 4) to this day under license, and have released AmigaOne computers based on PowerPC.

== History ==
=== Commodore Business Machines (Canada) Ltd. (1954–1976) ===
Commodore logo (1965–1984)

Jack Tramiel and Manfred Kapp met in the early 1950s while both employed by the Ace Typewriter Repair Company in New York City. In 1954, they partnered to sell used and reconditioned typewriters and used their profits to purchase the Singer Typewriter Company. After acquiring a local dealership selling Everest adding machines, Tramiel convinced Everest to give him and Kapp exclusive Canadian rights to its products and established Everest Office Machines in Toronto in 1955.

By 1958, the adding machine business was slowing. Tramiel made a connection with an Everest agent in England who alerted him to a business opportunity to import portable typewriters manufactured by a Czechoslovak company into Canada. On October 10, 1958, Tramiel and Kapp incorporated Commodore Portable Typewriter, Ltd. in Toronto to sell the imported typewriters. Commodore funded its operations through factoring over its first two years but faced a continual cash crunch. To bolster the company's financial condition, Tramiel and Kapp sold a portion of the company to Atlantic Acceptance Corporation, one of Canada's largest financing companies, and Atlantic President C. Powell Morgan became the chairman of Commodore. In 1962, the company went public on the Montreal Stock Exchange, under the name of Commodore Business Machines (Canada), Ltd.

With the financial backing of Atlantic Acceptance, Commodore expanded rapidly in the early 1960s. It purchased a factory in West Germany to manufacture its typewriters, began distributing office furniture for a Canadian manufacturer, and sold Pearlsound radio and stereo equipment. In 1965, it purchased the furniture company for which it served as the distributor and moved its headquarters to its facilities on Warden Avenue in the Scarborough district of Toronto. That same year, the company made a deal with a Japanese manufacturer to produce adding machines for Commodore, and purchased the office supply retailer Wilson Stationers to serve as an outlet for its typewriters.

In 1965, Atlantic Acceptance collapsed when it failed to make a routine payment. A subsequent investigation by a royal commission revealed a massive fraud scheme in which the company falsified financial records to acquire loans funneled into a web of subsidiaries where C. Powell Morgan held a personal stake. Morgan then pocketed the money or invested it in several unsuccessful ventures. Commodore was one of the Atlantic subsidiaries directly implicated in this scheme. Despite heavy suspicion, the commission could not find evidence of wrongdoing by Tramiel or Kapp. The scandal left Commodore in a worse financial position as it had borrowed heavily from Atlantic to purchase Wilson, and the loan was called in. Due to the financial scandal, Tramiel could only secure a bridge loan by paying interest well above the prime rate and putting the German factory up as collateral. Tramiel worked with a financier named Irving Gould to extricate himself, who brokered a deal to sell Wilson Stationers to an American company. Commodore now owed Gould money and still did not have sufficient capital to meet its payments, so Tramiel sold 17.9% of the company to Gould in 1966 for $500,000 (equivalent to $3.78 million in 2025). As part of the deal, Gould became the company's new chairman.

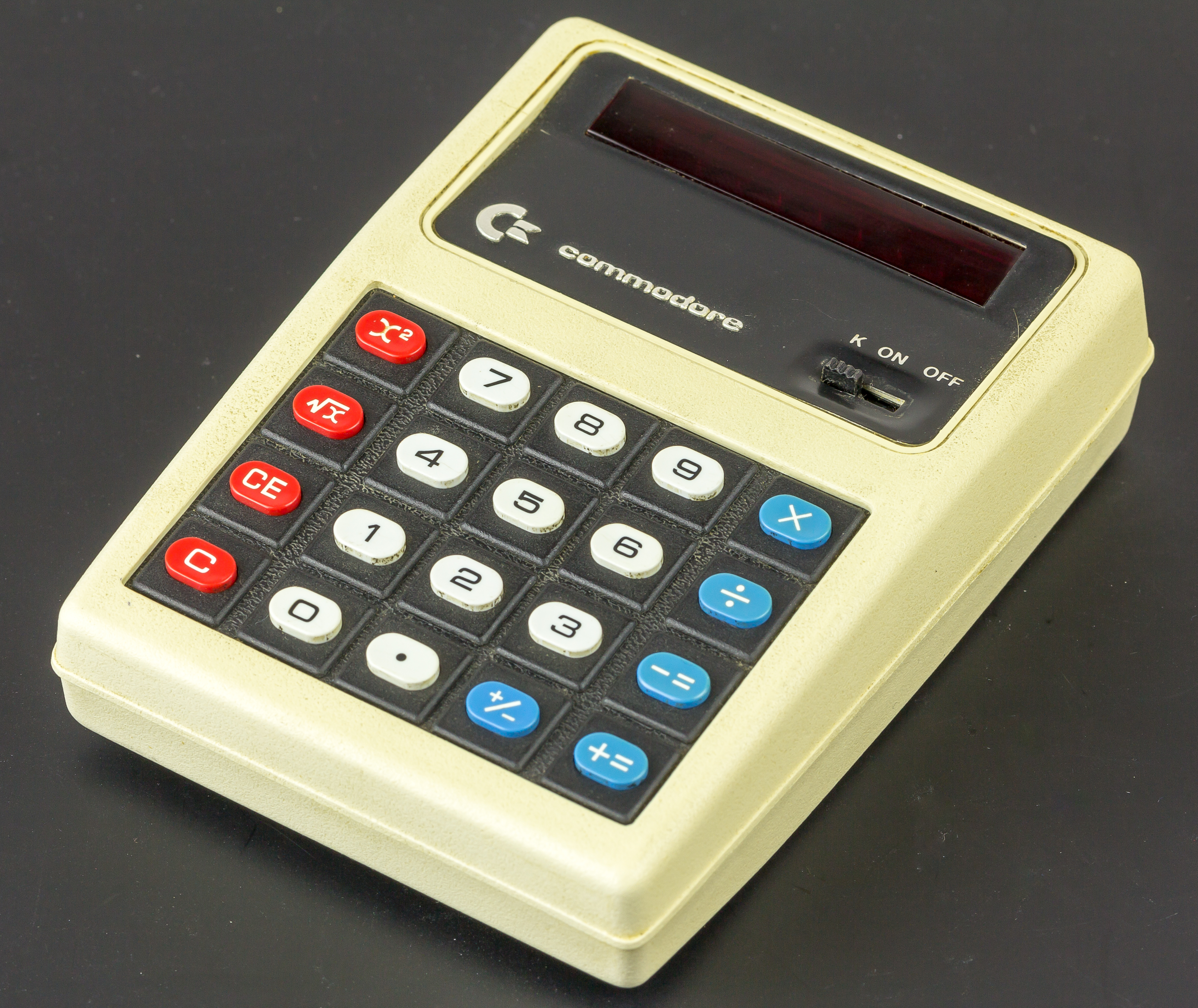
Minuteman MM3S

Tramiel saw some of the first electronic calculators through his Japanese contacts in the late 1960s. He pivoted from adding machines to marketing calculators produced by companies like Casio under the Commodore brand name. In 1969, Commodore began manufacturing its electronic calculators. Commodore soon had a profitable calculator line and was one of the more popular brands in the early 1970s, producing both consumer and scientific/programmable calculators. However, in 1975, Texas Instruments, the leading supplier of calculator parts, entered the market directly and put out a line of machines priced at less than Commodore's cost for the parts. Commodore obtained an infusion of cash from Gould, which Tramiel used beginning in 1976 to purchase several second-source chip suppliers, including MOS Technology, Inc., to assure his supply.

In 1976, Commodore Business Machines (Canada) Ltd. was dissolved and replaced by the newly formed Bahamian corporation Commodore International, which became the new parent of the Commodore group of companies.

=== Entry into the computer market and success (1977–1984) ===
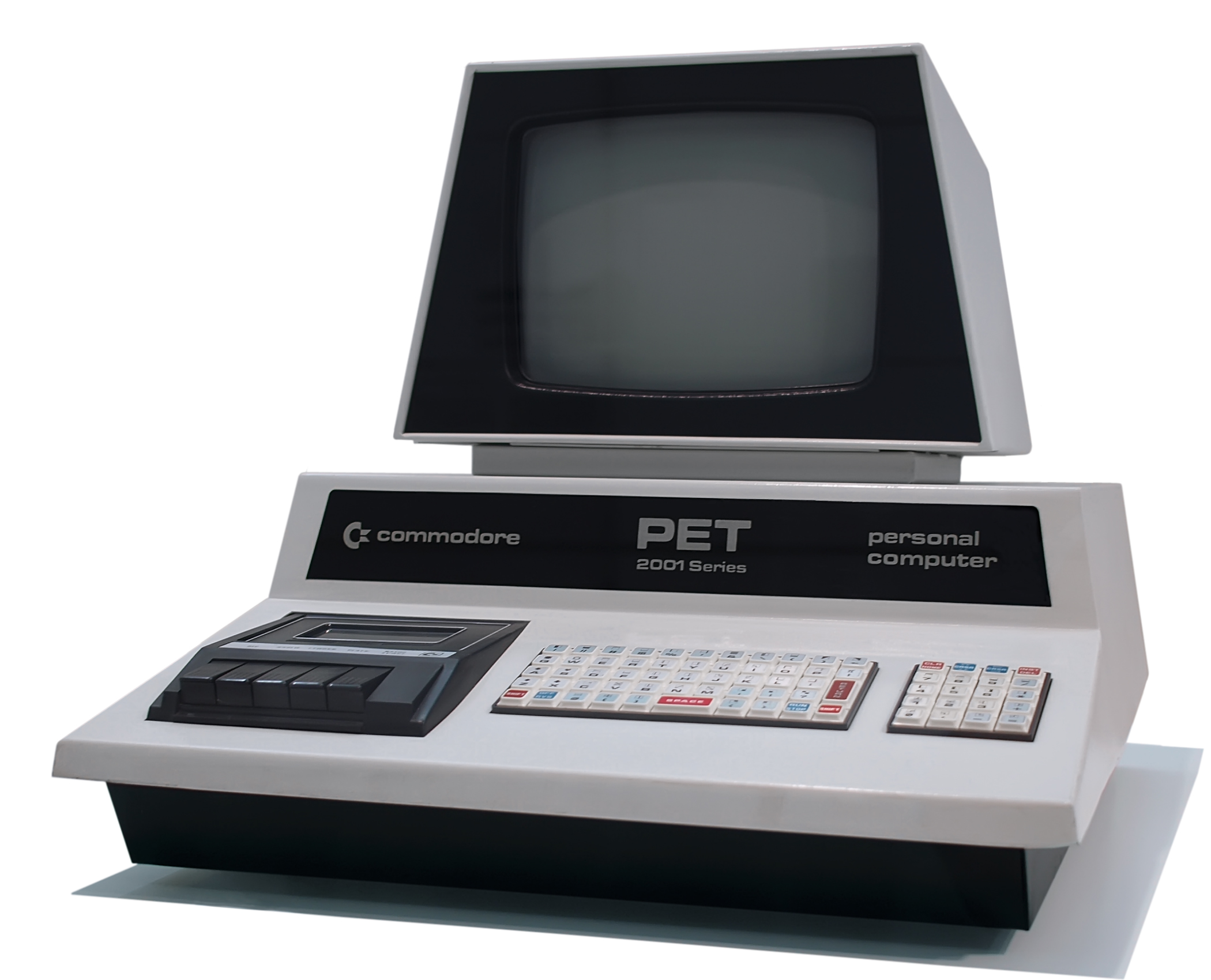
Commodore PET 2001 (1977)

Chuck Peddle convinced Jack Tramiel that calculators were a dead end business and that they should turn their attention to home computers. Peddle packaged his single-board computer design in a metal case, initially with a keyboard using calculator keys, later with a full-travel QWERTY keyboard, monochrome monitor, and tape recorder for program and data storage, to produce the Commodore PET (Personal Electronic Transactor). From PET's 1977 debut, Commodore was primarily a computer company.

Commodore had been reorganized the year before into Commodore International, Ltd., moving its financial headquarters to the Bahamas and its operational base to West Chester, Pennsylvania, near the MOS Technology site. The operational headquarters, where research and development of new products occurred, retained the name Commodore Business Machines, Inc. In 1980, Commodore launched production for the European market in Braunschweig, Germany. This site once employed up to 2000 employees, and in February 2017 an exhibition room for about 200 Commodore products was opened here to commemorate its past.

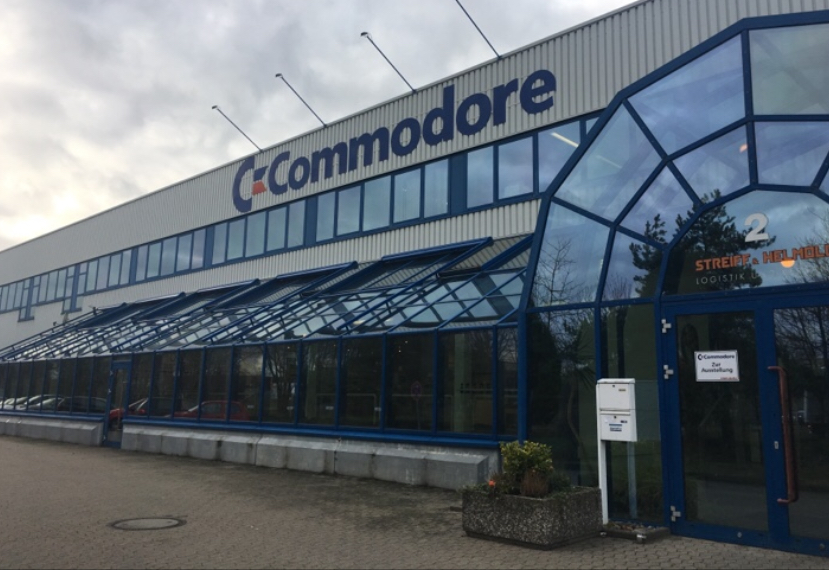
Commodore Werk in Braunschweig, West Germany, its large European HQ

By 1980, Commodore was one of the three largest microcomputer companies and the largest in the Common Market. The company had lost its early domestic-market sales leadership, however by mid-1981 its US market share was less than 5% and US computer magazines rarely discussed Commodore products. BYTE stated "the lack of a marketing strategy by Commodore, as well as its past nonchalant attitude toward the encouragement and development of good software, has hurt its credibility, especially in comparison to the other systems on the market". Writing for Programming the PET/CBM, Raeto Collin West wrote "CBM's product manuals are widely recognized to be unhelpful; this is one of the reasons for the existence of this book."

Commodore re-emphasized the US market with the VIC-20. The PET computer line was used primarily in schools, where its tough all-metal construction and ability to share printers and disk drives on a simple local area network were advantages, but PETs did not compete well in the home setting where graphics and sound were important. This was addressed with the VIC-20 in 1981, which was introduced at a cost of US$299 (equivalent to $895.00 in 2025) and sold in retail stores. Commodore bought aggressive advertisements featuring William Shatner asking consumers, "Why buy just a video game?" The strategy worked, and the VIC-20 became the first computer to ship more than one million units, with 2.5 million units sold over the machine's lifetime, which helped Commodore's sales in Canadian schools. In promotions aimed at schools and to reduce unsold inventory, PET models labeled 'Teacher's PET' were given away as part of a "buy 2 get 1 free" promotion. As of calendar year 1980, Commodore sales were $40 million, behind Apple Computer and Tandy Corporation in the market.

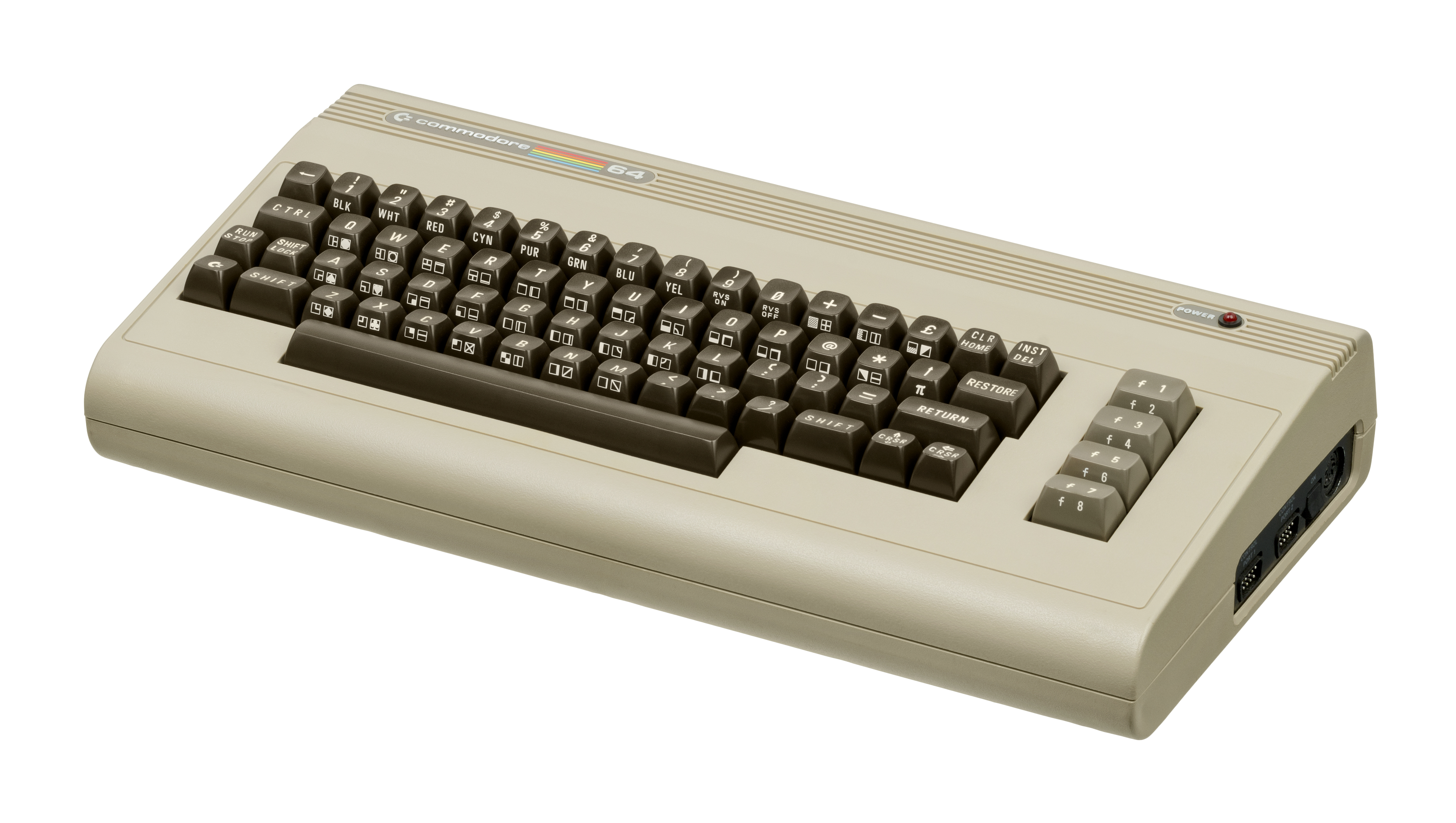
Commodore 64 (1982)

In 1982, Commodore introduced the Commodore 64 (C64) as the successor to the VIC-20. Due to its chips designed by MOS Technology, the C64 possessed advanced sound and graphics for its time, and is often credited with starting the computer demo scene. Its US$595 (equivalent to $1,677 in 2025) price was high compared to that of the VIC-20 but was much less expensive than any other 64K computer. Early C64 advertisements boasted that "You can't buy a better computer at twice the price", with Australian adverts in the mid-1980s using the slogan "Are you keeping up with the Commodore? Because the Commodore is keeping up with you."

In 1983, Tramiel decided to focus on market share and cut the price of the VIC-20 and C64 dramatically, starting the home computer war. TI responded by cutting prices on its 1981 TI-99/4A, leading to a price war involving most vendors other than Apple Computer, including Commodore, TI and Atari. Commodore began selling the VIC-20 and C64 through mass-market retailers such as K-Mart, in addition to traditional computer stores. By the end of this conflict, Commodore had shipped around 22 million C64s, making the C64 the best-selling computer, until the Raspberry Pi overtook it in 2019.

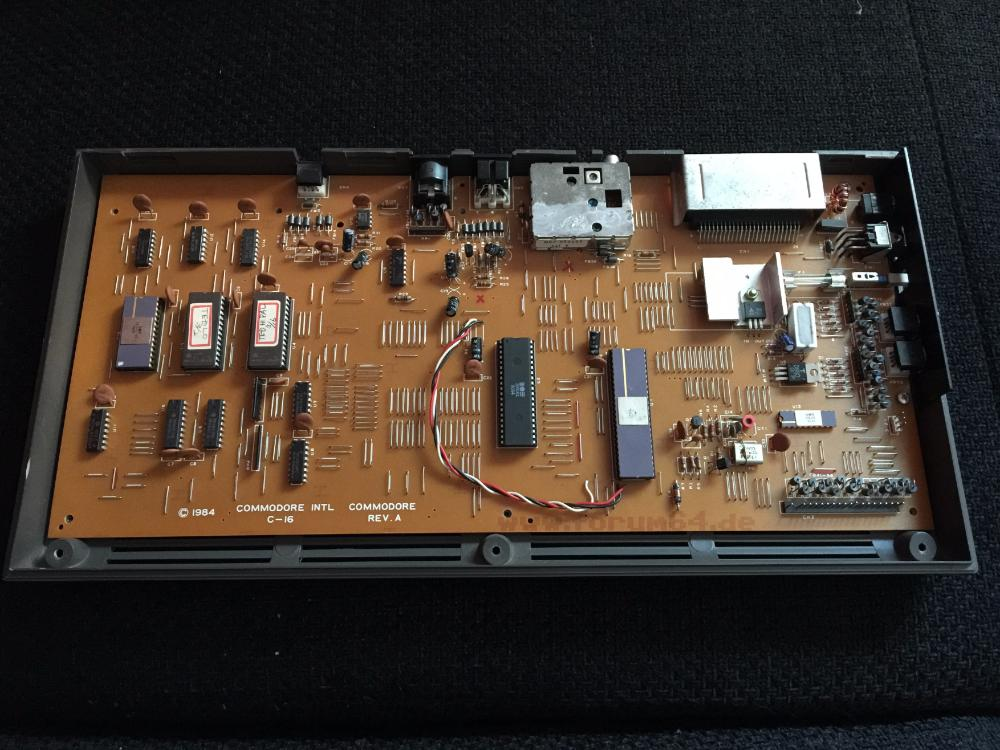
The "heart" of Commodore's philosophy: Early Commodore 16 main PCB (prototype), not used in the regular series model. According to Commodore computer engineer Bil Herd, this single-sided PCB was an extraordinary attempt of cost saving by Commodore, which probably failed due to technical problems.

At the June 1983 Consumer Electronics Show, Commodore lowered the retail price of the C64 to $300, and stores sold it for as little as $199. At one point, the company was selling as many computers as the rest of the industry combined. Prices for the VIC-20 and C64 were $50 lower than Atari's prices for the 600XL and 800XL. Commodore's strategy was to, according to a spokesman, devote 50% of its efforts to the under-$500 market, 30% on the $500–1000 market, and 20% on the over-$1,000 market. Its vertical integration and Tramiel's focus on cost control helped Commodore do well during the price war, with $1 billion in 1983 sales. Although the company and Tramiel's focus on cost cutting over product testing caused hardware defects in the initial C64, some resolved in later iterations. By early 1984, Synapse Software, the largest provider of third-party Atari 8-bit software, received 65% of sales from the Commodore market, and Commodore sold almost three times as many computers as Atari that year.

Despite its focus on the lower end of the market, Commodore's computers were also sold in upmarket department stores such as Harrods. The company also attracted several high-profile customers. In 1984, the company's British branch became the first manufacturer to receive a royal warrant for computer business systems. NASA's Kennedy Space Center was another noted customer, with over 60 Commodore systems processing documentation, tracking equipment and employees, costing jobs, and ensuring the safety of hazardous waste.

=== Departure of Tramiel, acquisition of Amiga and competition with Atari (1984–1987) ===
Commodore's logo, dubbed the "Chicken Lips"

By early 1984, Commodore was the most successful home computer company, with more than $1 billion (equivalent to $2.62 billion in 2025) in annual revenue and $100 million (equivalent to $262 million in 2025) in net income, whilst competitors had large losses. The company's revenue of $425 million in the fourth calendar quarter of 1983 more than doubled its revenue of $176 million a year earlier. Although Creative Computing compared the company to "a well-armed battleship [which] rules the micro waves" and threatened to destroy rivals like Atari and Coleco, Commodore's board of directors, affected by the price spiral, decided to exit the company. In January 1984, an internal power struggle resulted after Tramiel resigned due to disagreements with the board chairman, Irving Gould. Gould replaced Tramiel with Marshall F. Smith, a steel executive without a computer or consumer marketing experience. Tramiel's departure at the moment of Commodore's greatest financial success surprised the industry.

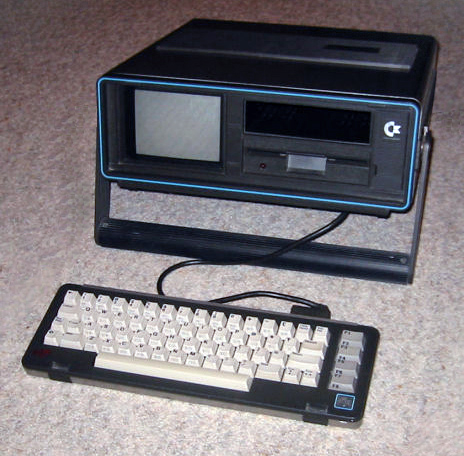
Commodore SX-64 (1984)

In May 1984, Tramiel founded a new company, Tramel Technology, and hired several Commodore engineers to begin work on a next-generation computer design. That same year, Tramiel discovered Warner Communications wanted to sell Atari, which was rumored to be losing about $10,000 a day. Interested in Atari's overseas manufacturing and worldwide distribution network for a new computer, he approached Atari and entered negotiations. After several talks with Atari in May and June 1984, Tramiel had secured funding and bought Atari's Consumer Division (which included the console and home computer departments) in July. In July 1984 Tramiel bought the consumer side of Atari Inc. from Warner Communications and released the Atari ST earlier in 1985 for about $800. As more executives and researchers left Commodore after the announcement to join Tramiel's new company Atari Corp., Commodore followed by filing lawsuits against four former engineers for theft of trade secrets in late July. This was intended, in effect, to bar Tramiel from releasing his new computer. One of Tramiel's first acts after forming Atari Corp. was to fire most of Atari's remaining staff and to cancel almost all ongoing projects to review their continued viability. In late July to early August, Tramiel representatives discovered the original Amiga contract from the previous fall. Seeing a chance to gain some leverage, Tramiel immediately used the agreement to counter-sue Commodore on August 13.

The remaining Commodore management sought to salvage the company's fortunes and plan for the future, and did so by buying a small startup company called Amiga Corporation in August 1984 for $25 million ($12.8 million in cash and $550,000 in common shares). Amiga became a subsidiary of Commodore, called Commodore-Amiga, Inc. During development in 1981, Amiga had exhausted venture capital and needed more financing. Jay Miner and his company had approached their former employer, the Warner-owned Atari, who paid Amiga to continue development work. In return, Atari received the exclusive use of the design as a video game console for one year, after which Atari would have the right to add a keyboard and market it as a complete Amiga computer. The Atari-Amiga contract and engineering logs identify the Atari-Amiga product was designated as the 1850XLD. As Atari was heavily involved with Disney at the time, it was later code-named "Mickey", and the 256K memory expansion board was codenamed "Minnie".

Still suffering serious financial problems, Amiga sought more monetary support from investors that entire spring. At around the same time that Tramiel was negotiating with Atari, Amiga entered into discussions with Commodore. The discussions ultimately led to Commodore's intentions to purchase Amiga outright, which Commodore viewed would cancel any outstanding contracts – including Atari Inc.'s. Tramiel counter-sued on the basis of this interpretation, and sought damages and an injunction to bar Amiga and effectively Commodore from producing any resembling technology, to render Commodore's new acquisition and the source for its next generation of computers useless. The resulting court case lasted several years.

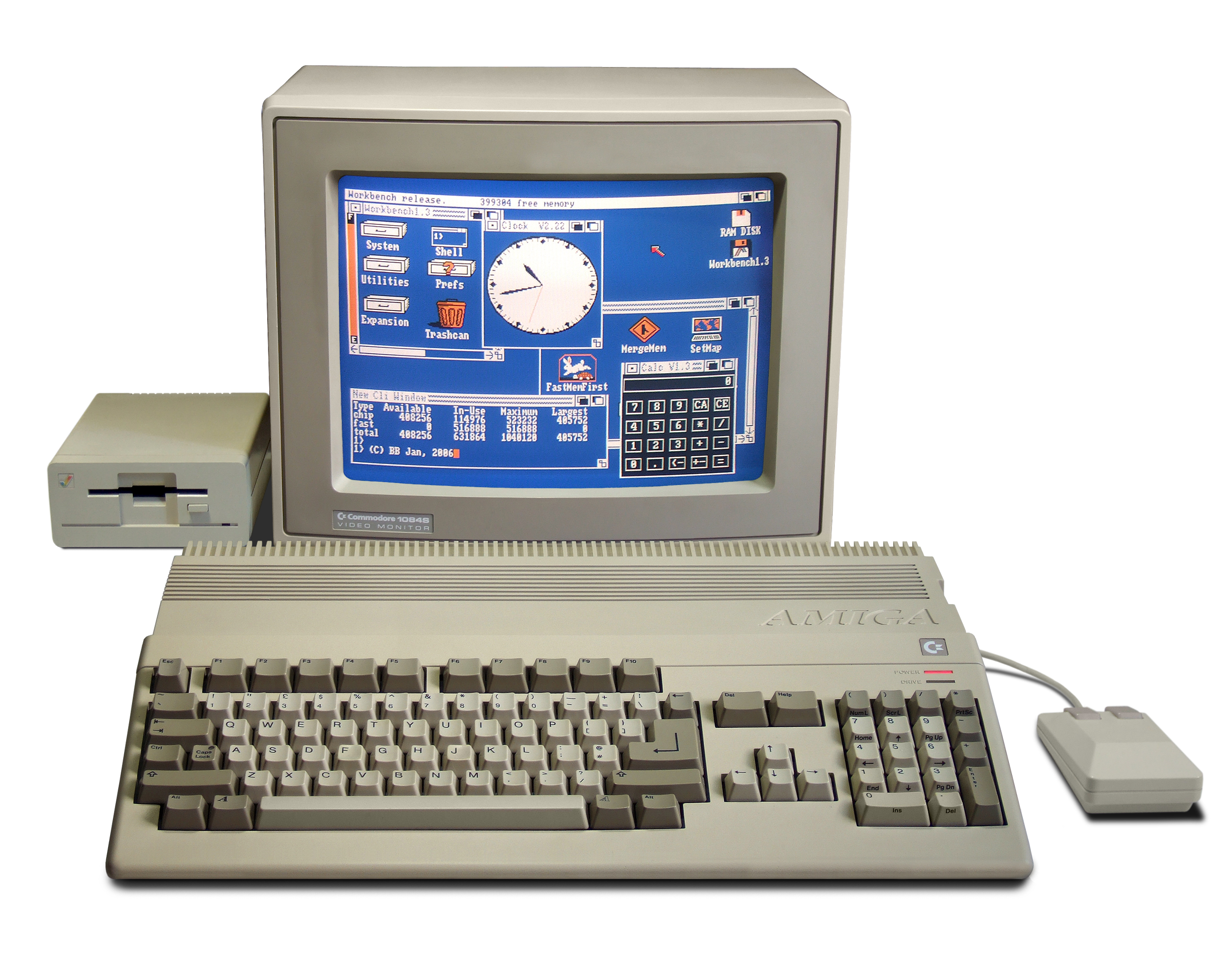
Amiga 500 (1987)

Commodore introduced a new 32-bit computer design to market in the fall of 1985 named the Amiga 1000 for US$1,295, first demonstrated at the CES in 1984. An Atari-Commodore rivalry continued throughout the life of the ST and Amiga platforms. While the rivalry was a holdover from the competition between the C64 and Atari 800, the events leading to the launch of the ST and Amiga served to further alienate fans of each computer, who disagreed as to which platform was superior. This was reflected in sales numbers for the two platforms until the release of the Amiga 500 in 1987, which led the Amiga sales to exceed the ST by about 1.5 to 1, despite reaching the market later. However, neither platform captured a significant share of the world computer market, with only the Apple Macintosh surviving the industry-wide shift to Intel-based x86 computers using Microsoft Windows.

Commodore and Atari both sought to compete in the workstation market, with Commodore announcing in 1988 a Transputer-driven system based on the Amiga 2000 in response to the Atari Transputer Workstation. Similarly, a Unix workstation based on the Amiga 2000, featuring the 68020 CPU, was detailed as Atari announced developer shipments of its own 68030-based Unix workstation within a claimed "to or three months". Atari's workstation, the TT030, eventually arrived in 1990 without a version of Unix available, this only eventually becoming available to developers in late 1991. Commodore's workstation arrived in 1990 in the form of the Amiga 3000UX.

=== Decline and later years (1987–1994) ===
Commodore suffered a poor reputation with its dealers and customers, and upon the 1987 introduction of the Amiga 2000, Commodore retreated from its earlier strategy of selling its computers to discount outlets and toy stores and favored authorized dealers. Adam Osborne stated in April 1981 that "the microcomputer industry abounds with horror stories describing the way Commodore treats its dealers and its customers." Commodore under Tramiel had a reputation for cannibalizing its own products with newer ones; Doug Carlston and others in the industry believed rumors in late 1983 that Commodore would discontinue the C64 despite its success because they disliked the company's business practices, including its poor treatment of dealers and introducing new computers incompatible with existing ones. A Boston reseller said, "It's too unsettling to be one of their dealers and not know where you stand with them." After Tramiel's departure, Ahoy! wrote that he "had never been able to establish excellent relations with computer dealers ... computer retailers have accused Commodore of treating them as harshly as if they were suppliers or competitors, and as a result, many have become disenchanted with Commodore and dropped the product line". Software developers also disliked the company, with one stating that "Dealing with Commodore was like dealing with Attila the Hun." At the 1987 Comdex, an informal InfoWorld survey found that none of the developers present planned to write for Commodore platforms. As for Commodore's own software, InfoWorld stated in 1984 that "so far, the normal standard for Commodore software is mediocrity".

Commodore almost went bankrupt in early 1986, obtaining a one-month extension on repaying $192 million in loans that it had defaulted on in June 1985. Tramiel's successor, Marshall F. Smith, left the company in 1986, as did his successor Thomas Rattigan in 1987 after a failed boardroom coup. The head of Blue Chip Electronics, a former Commodore employee, described the company as "a well-known revolving door". Commodore faced the problem when marketing the Amiga of still being seen as the company that made cheap computers like the C64 and VIC. The C64 remained the company's cash cow but its technology was aging. By the late 1980s, the personal computer market had become dominated by the IBM PC and Apple Macintosh platforms. Commodore's marketing efforts for the Amiga were less successful in breaking the new computer into an established market compared to the success of its 8-bit line. The company put effort into developing and promoting consumer products that would not be in demand for years, such as an Amiga 500-based HTPC called CDTV.

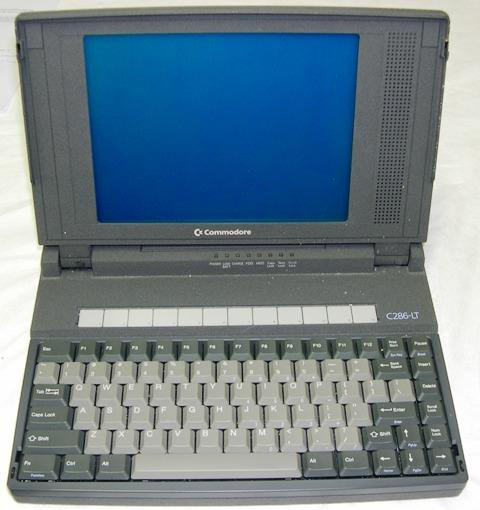
Commodore C286-LT (1990)

As early as 1986, the mainstream press was predicting Commodore's demise, and in 1990 Computer Gaming World wrote of its "abysmal record of customer and technical support in the past". Nevertheless, as profits and the stock price began to slide, The Philadelphia Inquirer's Top 100 Businesses Annual continued to list several Commodore executives among the highest-paid in the region and the paper documented the company's questionable hiring practices and large bonuses paid to executives amid shareholder discontent.

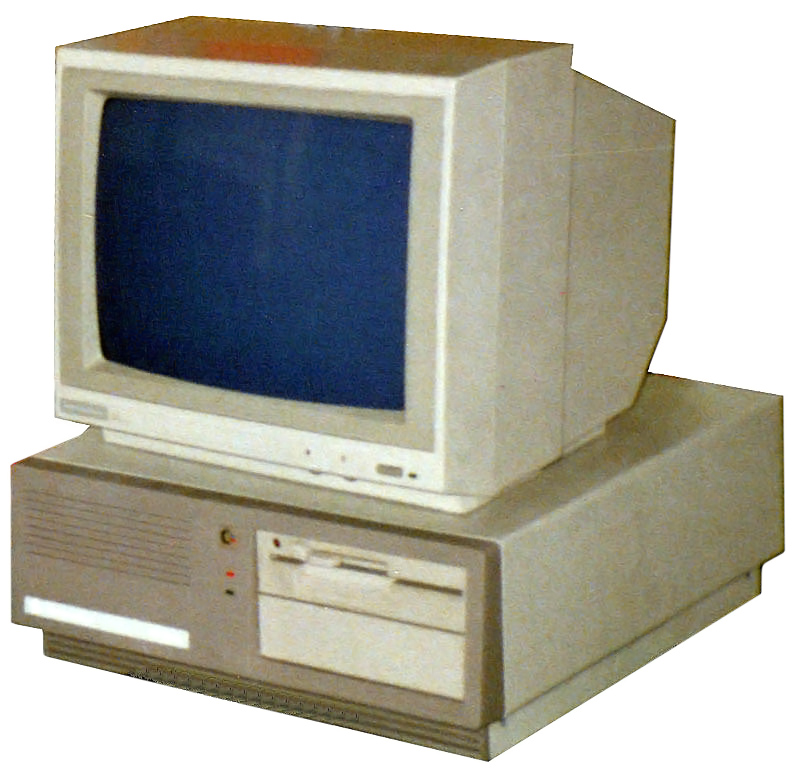
Commodore PC20 (1992)

Commodore failed to update the Amiga to keep pace as the PC platform advanced. CBM continued selling the Amiga 2000 with 7.14 MHz 68000 CPUs, even though the Amiga 3000 with its 25 MHz 68030 was on the market. Apple, by this time, was using the 68040 and had relegated the 68000 to its lowest-end model, the black and white Macintosh Classic. The 68000 was used in the Sega Genesis, one of the leading game consoles of the era, Computers fitted with high-color VGA graphics cards and SoundBlaster (or compatible) sound cards had also caught up with the Amiga's performance, and Commodore began to fade from the consumer market.

Although the Amiga was originally conceived as a gaming machine, Commodore had always emphasized the Amiga's potential for professional applications, but the Amiga's high-performance sound and graphics were irrelevant to MS-DOS-based routine business word-processing and data-processing requirements, and the machine could not successfully compete with computers in a business market that was rapidly undergoing commoditization. Commodore introduced a range of PC compatible systems designed by its German division, and while the Commodore name was better known in the US than some of its competition, the systems' price and specifications were only average.

Sales of the PC range were strong in Germany, however, seeing Commodore acquire a 28% share of this market segment in 1990, second only to IBM. Things were less rosy in the United States, where Commodore had a 6% share in the market segment as of 1989, down from 26% in 1984. Forbes's Evan McGlinn wrote regarding the firm's decline, citing management as the source cause: "the absentee-landlord management style of globe-trotting chairman and chief executive Irving Gould". With the Amiga only representing less than 20% of the company's sales in the 1987 fiscal year, product lines such as PC-compatibles and Commodore's 8-bit computers remained important to the company's finances even as the Amiga's share of total sales increased. In 1989, with the Amiga accounting for 45% of total sales, the PC business showed modest growth to 24% of total sales, and the Commodore 64 and 128 products still generated 31% of the company's revenues.

Commodore attempted to develop new chipsets during the early 1990s, first the Advanced Amiga Architecture and later the Hombre. Funding problems meant that they did not materialize as ultimately the company would go bust. In 1992, the Amiga 600 replaced the Amiga 500, which removed the numeric keypad, Zorro expansion slot, and other functionality, but added IDE, PCMCIA, and intended as a cost-reduced design. Designed as the Amiga 300, a non-expandable model to sell for less than the Amiga 500, the 600 became a replacement for the 500 due to the unexpectedly higher cost of manufacture. Productivity developers increasingly moved to PC and Macintosh, while the console wars took over the gaming market. David Pleasance, managing director of Commodore UK, described the Amiga 600 as a "complete and utter screw-up". In the same year, Commodore released the Amiga 1200 and Amiga 4000 computers, which featured an improved graphics chipset, the AGA. The advent of PC games using 3D graphics such as Doom and Wolfenstein 3D spelled the end of Amiga as a gaming platform.

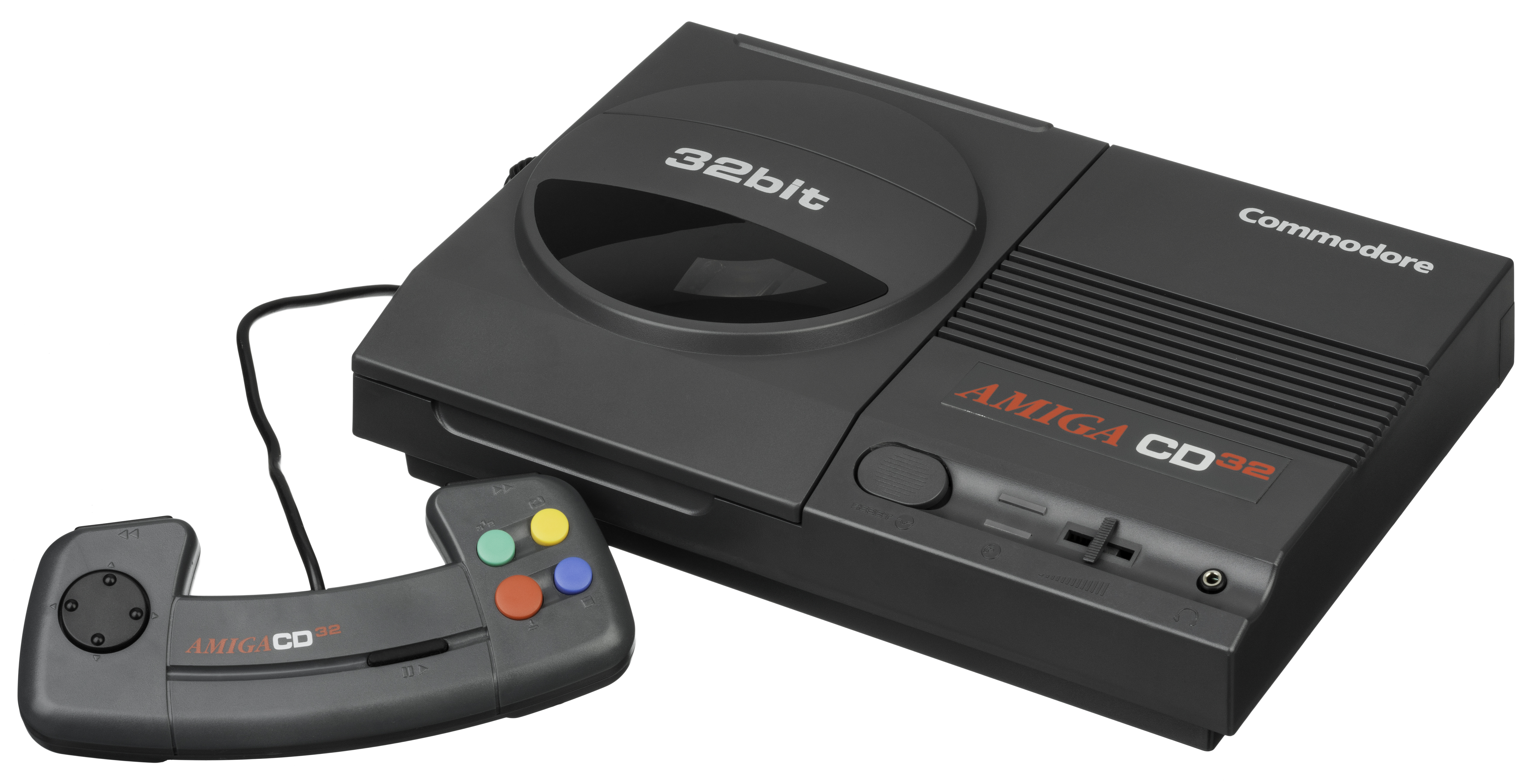
Amiga CD32 (1993)

In 1993, Commodore launched a 32-bit CD-ROM-based game console called the Amiga CD32, described as a 'make or break' system, according to Pleasance. The Amiga CD32 was not sufficiently profitable to return Commodore to solvency, however this was not a universal opinion at Commodore, with Commodore Germany hardware expert Rainer Benda stating "The CD32 was a year late for Commodore. In other words, here, too, it might have been better to focus on the core business than jump on a console and hope to sell 300,000 or more units quickly to avoid bankruptcy."

"Commodore's high point was the Amiga 1000 (1985). The Amiga was so far ahead of its time that almost nobody – including Commodore's marketing department – could fully articulate what it was all about. Today, it's obvious the Amiga was the first multimedia computer. Still, in those days, it was derided as a game machine because few people grasped the importance of advanced graphics, sound, and video. Nine years later, vendors are still struggling to make systems that work like 1985 Amigas."

— Byte Magazine, August 1994

In 1992, all UK servicing and warranty repairs were outsourced to Wang Laboratories, which was replaced by ICL after failing to meet repair demand during the Christmas rush in 1992. Commodore International's Canadian subsidiary authorized 3D Microcomputers of Ontario to manufacture IBM PC clones with the Commodore brand in late 1993. Commodore exited the IBM PC clone market entirely during the 1993 fiscal year, citing the low profitability of this market. PC sales had remained relatively stable and, accounting for 37% of revenue from sales in 1993, had grown modestly as declines in both unit sales and revenues were recorded for the Amiga and Commodore 64 product lines.

By 1994, only Commodore's operations in Canada, Germany, and the United Kingdom were still profitable. Commodore announced voluntary bankruptcy and liquidation on April 29, 1994, causing the board of directors to "authorize the transfer of its assets to trustees for the benefit of its creditors", according to an official statement. With Commodore International having reported a $8.2 million quarterly loss in the US, hopes were expressed that European divisions might be able to continue trading and even survive the demise of the parent company, with a management buyout considered a possibility. Other possibilities included the sale of profitable parts of the company to other parties, with Philips and Samsung considered "likely choices". However, no sale was ever completed.

== Post-bankruptcy ==
=== Sale to Escom and bankruptcy ===
Commodore's former assets went separate ways following liquidation, with none of the descendant companies repeating Commodore's early success. Subsidiaries Commodore UK and Commodore B.V. (Netherlands) survived bankruptcy. The UK division filed a buyout proposal to the Supreme Court in the Bahamas and was considered the front runner in the bid due to press exposure at the time; the other initial bidders were Samsung, Philips and Amstrad in mid-1994. Commodore UK and Commodore BV stayed in business by selling old inventory and making computer speakers and other types of computer peripherals, however Commodore BV dissolved in early 1995. Commodore UK withdrew its bid at the start of the auction process after several larger companies, including Gateway Computers and Dell Inc., became interested, primarily for Commodore's patents relating to the Amiga. The only companies who entered bids at the end were Dell and Escom; the successful bidder was German PC maker Escom AG on April 22, 1995, beating Dell's bid by $6.6 million. Escom paid US$14 million for the assets of Commodore International. Commodore UK went into liquidation on August 30, 1995.

Escom separated the Commodore and Amiga operations into separate divisions, the latter becoming Amiga Technologies GmbH, and quickly started using the Commodore brand name on a line of PCs sold in Europe while concepting and developing new Amiga computers. They also debuted a brand new logo for Amiga. By the late 1995, they had established a distribution network that included an American branch covering the USA and Canada, a French branch covering France, a British branch covering the UK, South Africa and India, a Belgian branch covering Belgium and Luxembourg, a German branch covering Germany and Poland, a Czech branch covering the Czech Republic and Slovakia, a Danish branch covering the five Scandinavian countries, a Swiss branch covering Switzerland, Austria, Italy, Malta, Turkey, Greece, the Balkans and the former USSR countries, a Middle Eastern branch covering the Middle East (excluding Israel, Cyprus), Libya and Morocco, and an Iberian branch covering Portugal, Spain and Africa (excluding South Africa, Libya, Morocco, Eswatini and Lesotho). However, it soon started losing money due to over-expansion, declared bankruptcy on July 15, 1996, and was liquidated. Escom's Dutch arm, Escom B.V., survived bankruptcy and went on to purchase the Commodore brand from its bankrupt parent. The company then renamed itself to Commodore B.V. Meanwhile, a deal for Chicago-based VisCorp to purchase Amiga Technologies GmbH fell through, and instead it was acquired by Gateway 2000 in March 1997, taking both the Amiga properties and the Commodore patents.

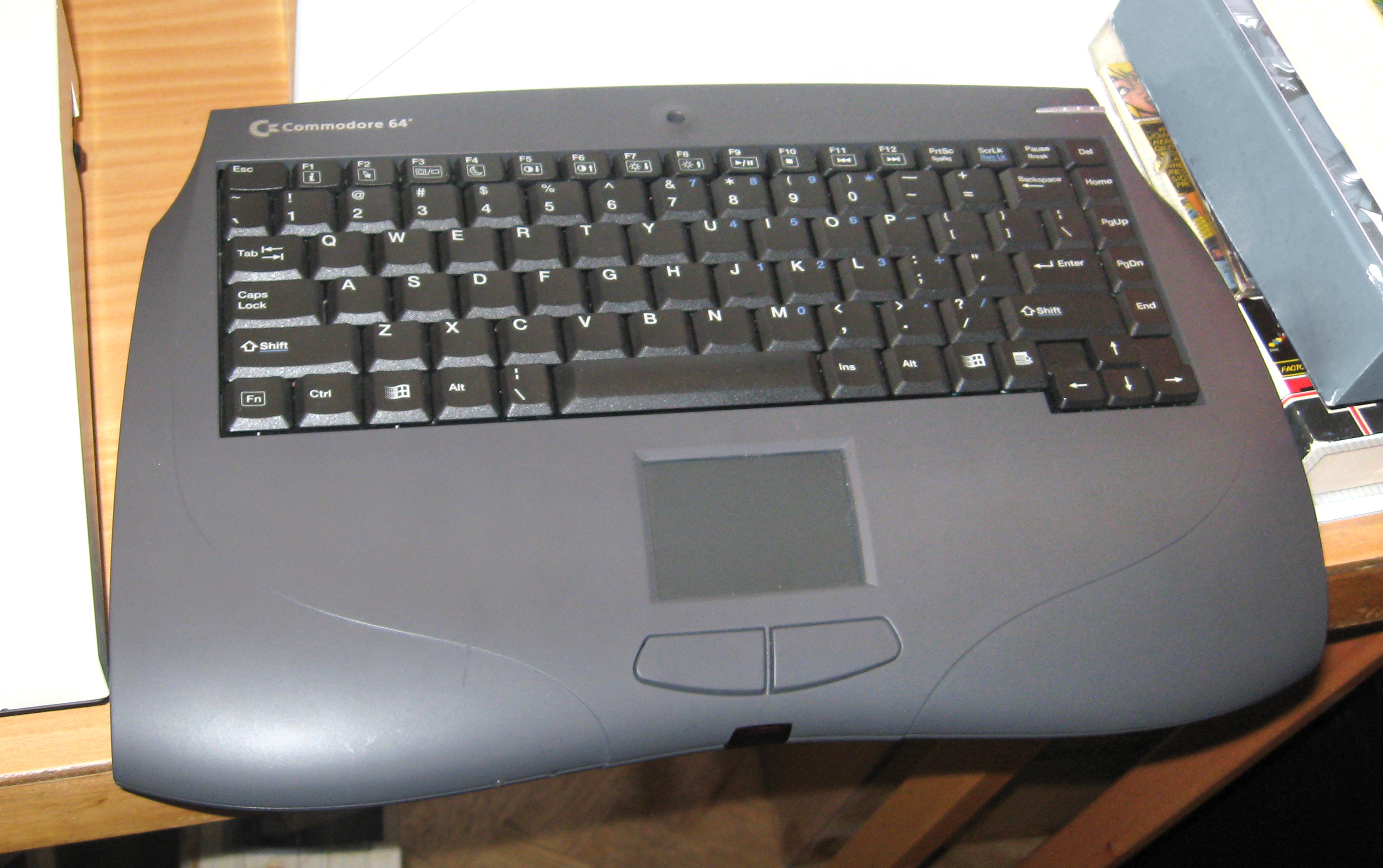
Commodore 64 Web-it PC, made by Tulip Computers c. 1998, with an AMD Élan processor

==== Brand name ====
In September 1997, Dutch computer maker Tulip Computers acquired the Commodore brand name from Commodore B.V. and made a number of Wintel computers under subsidiary Commodore International B.V., although it did not find much success. In July 2004, Tulip announced a new series of products using the Commodore name: fPET, a flash memory-based USB flash drive; mPET, a flash-based MP3 Player and digital recorder; eVIC, a 20 GB music player. Tulip also licensed the Commodore trademark and logo to the producers of the C64 DTV, a single-chip implementation of the Commodore 64 computer with 30 built-in games.

In late 2004, Tulip sold Commodore International B.V. to Yeahronimo Media Ventures (YMV), a digital music software startup providing legal music downloads in the Netherlands, for €22 million, to be paid in instalments over several years until 2010. The sale was completed in March 2005 after months of negotiations; YMV would not become the sole owner until 2010 after buying the remaining shares from Tulip (by then renamed to Nedfield Holding B.V.) which had gone bankrupt. YMV soon renamed itself to Commodore International Corporation (CIC) — its operational office was in the Netherlands but had headquarters in California — and started an operation intended to relaunch the Commodore brand in the video gaming field. The company then launched its Gravel line of products: Gravel in Pocket personal multimedia players equipped with Wi-Fi and the Gravel in Home, hoping the Commodore brand would help them take off, introduced at CeBIT 2007 with a media "entertainment platform" called CommodoreWorld, and also launched gaming PCs running Windows Vista 64-bit. However the company did not find success with these products. On June 24, 2009, CIC in the United States renamed itself to Reunite Investments, Inc., with the Commodore brand retaining under ownership by its subsidiary CIC Europe Holding B.V. (which would later be renamed into C= Holdings B.V.), trading as Commodore Consumer Electronics (CCE).

CIC's founder, Ben van Wijhe, bought a Hong Kong-based company called Asiarim. Reunite Investments then sold the brand to Commodore Licensing B.V., a subsidiary of Asiarim, later in 2010. It was sold again on November 7, 2011. This transaction became the basis of a legal dispute between Asiarim — which, even after that date, made commercial use of the Commodore trademark, among others by advertising for sale Commodore-branded computers, and dealing licensing agreements for the trademarks — and the new owners, that was resolved by the United States District Court for the Southern District of New York on December 16, 2013, in favor of the new owners. Since then the company holding the brand name turned into Polabe Holding N.V., then Net B.V., and is currently named Commodore Corporation B.V.

In 2010 an attempt was made to relaunch the brand as Commodore USA in Florida, but it faltered after its founder passed away in 2012. On December 26, 2014, two Italian entrepreneurs licensed the brand and founded Commodore Business Machines Ltd. in London, to manufacture smartphones. The Commodore PET, introduced in July 2015, was an Android smartphone which was going to feature Commodore 64 and Amiga emulation built-in, but which was ultimately never released with these features.

==== Copyrights and patents ====
Ownership of the remaining assets of Commodore International, including the copyrights and patents, and the Amiga trademarks, passed from bankrupt Escom to Gateway 2000 in 1997. Jim Collas became director of Amiga Technologies and he assembled a new team to work on a new generation of Amiga computers and other products on a new platform, prototyping one called the Amiga MCC and planning a potential tablet computer. However when Jeffrey Weitzen was chosen to become CEO of Gateway, who was not convinced of Collas's plans, he informed that Amiga Technologies division will be sold. On the final day of 1999, Gateway sold the copyrights and trademarks of Amiga to Amino, a Washington-based company founded, among others, by former Gateway subcontractors Bill McEwen and Fleecy Moss; Amino immediately renamed itself to Amiga, Inc. Gateway retained the patents but gave a license to Amiga, Inc. to use the patents. The last of the Commodore-Amiga patents (EP0316325B1 for "Cursor controlled user interface system", based on US887053) expired on July 14, 2007.

On March 15, 2004, Amiga, Inc. announced that on April 23, 2003, it had transferred its rights over past and future versions of the AmigaOS (but not yet over other intellectual property) to Itec, LLC, later acquired by KMOS, Inc., a Delaware-based company. Shortly afterwards, based on loans and security agreements between Amiga, Inc. and Itec, LLC, the remaining intellectual property assets were transferred from Amiga, Inc. to KMOS, Inc. On March 16, 2005, KMOS, Inc. announced that it had completed all registrations with the State of Delaware to change its corporate name to Amiga, Inc. The Commodore/Amiga copyrights, including all their works up to 1993, were later sold to Cloanto in 2012. In 2018, Amiga, Inc. was sued again by Belgian company Hyperion Entertainment. This was settled on June 5, 2026. On February 1, 2019, Amiga, Inc. sold all its remaining IP to Amiga Corporation, who also acquired the IP previously assigned by Amiga, Inc. to Cloanto.

==== Semiconductor subsidiary ====
The Commodore Semiconductor Group (formerly MOS Technology, Inc.), the silicon wafer foundry and integrated circuit manufacturing unit of Commodore International, was bought by its former management in January 1995 and resumed operations under the name GMT Microelectronics, utilizing a troubled facility in Norristown, Pennsylvania that Commodore had closed in 1992. In 2001, the United States Environmental Protection Agency shut the plant down, and GMT ceased operations and was liquidated.

== Commodore International Corporation (2025–present) ==
Commodore International Corporation
- Type: Private
- Industry: Electronics; Computer hardware Computer software
- Founded: June 2025, 9; 16 months ago Delaware, United States
- Founders: Christian Simpson, Sean Donohue, Leo Nigro, Alex Rozenblat
- Headquarters: United States
- Area served: Worldwide
- Key people: Christian Simpson (CEO); Alex Rozenblat (CFO); Fred Stickel (COO)
- Products: Commodore 64 Ultimate; Commodore TAC-2 Joystick
- Website: commodore.net (Official website)

On July 31, 2025, a group led by Christian "Peri Fractic" Simpson acquired all 47 surviving original Commodore trademarks dating back to 1983, including the "C=" and "Commodore". They were bought reportedly for a "low seven-figure sum" from Commodore Corporation B.V., which had inherited them from Tulip. Simpson and others incorporated a new Commodore International Corporation in the state of Delaware on June 9, 2025. Simpson teased the purchase two days earlier in a video uploaded on his YouTube channel Retro Recipes.

On July 12, 2025, Commodore announced its first product, the Commodore 64 Ultimate, an FPGA-based system that replicates the functionality of the Commodore 64 with a few modern enhancements. Funded using a direct pre-order system, it was released to consumers in December 2025. The company announced the 64C Ultimate Slimline on April 28, 2026 as a similar FPGA recreation of the 1986 redesigned Commodore 64. In June 2026, Commodore announced the Callback 8020 flip phone, designed to be a digitally minimalist "detox" phone.

The company entered a cross-licensing agreement in August 2026 with Amiga Corporation, the owner of the Amiga trademarks and source codes, allowing the old 8-bit code to be legally used by Commodore in computers. In return, Commodore allows Amiga Corporation to legally use the Commodore name and logos.

== Sponsorship ==
Commodore sponsored the German football club Bayern Munich from 1984 until 1989, the English football club Chelsea from 1987 to 1994. and the French football clubs Auxerre from 1991 to 1992 and Paris Saint-Germain from 1991 to 1994.

== Product line ==
The product line consists of original Commodore products.

=== Calculators ===
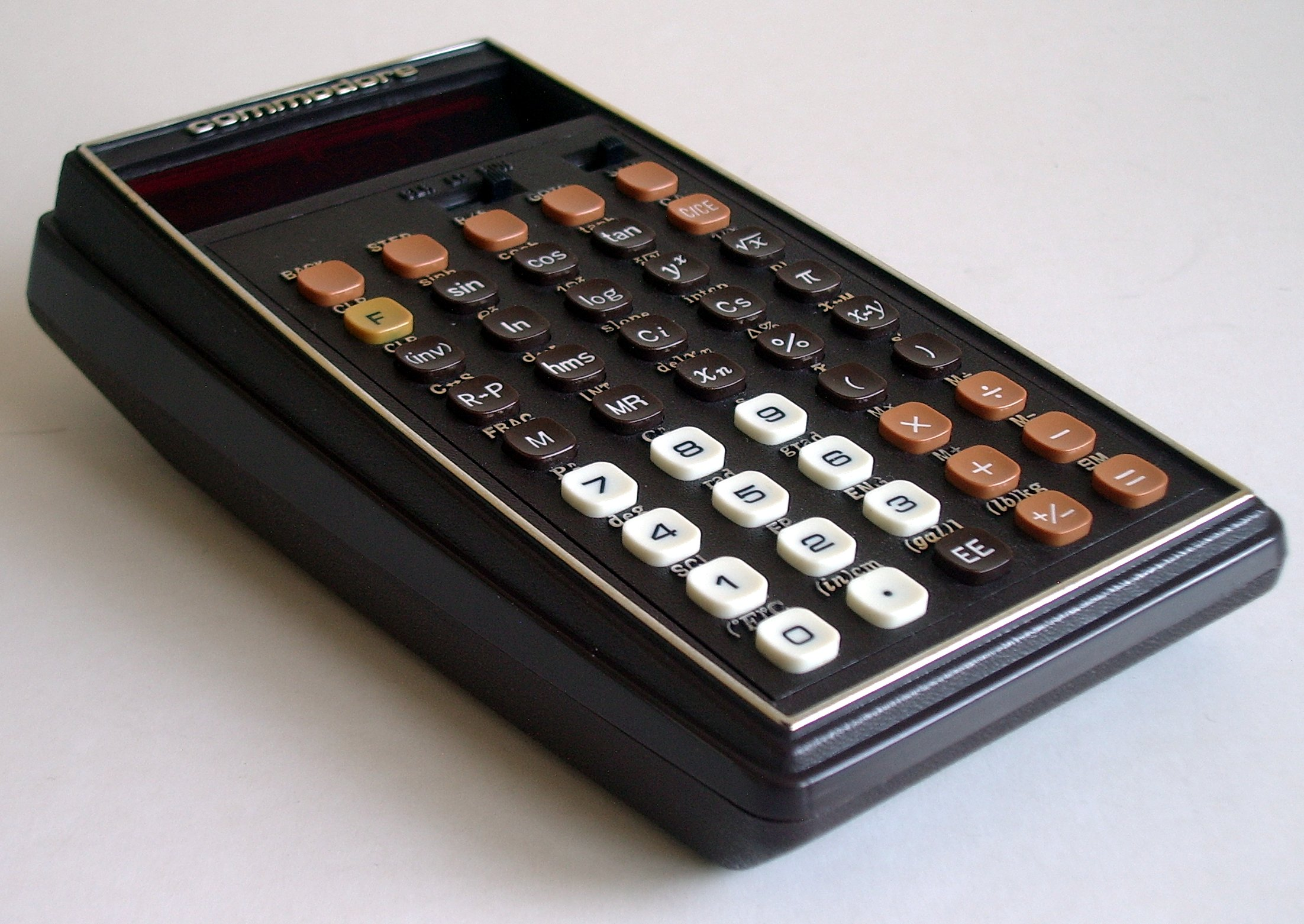
Commodore PR-100 programmable calculator

774D, 776M, 796M, 9R23, C108, C110, F4146R, F4902, MM3, Minuteman 6, P50, PR100, SR1800, SR4120D, SR4120R, SR4148D, SR4148R, SR4190R, SR4212, SR4912, SR4921RPN, SR5120D, SR5120R, SR5148D, SR5148R, SR5190R, SR59, SR7919, SR7949, SR9150R, SR9190R, US*3, US*8 and The Specialist series: M55 (The Mathematician), N60 (The Navigator), S61 (The Statistician).

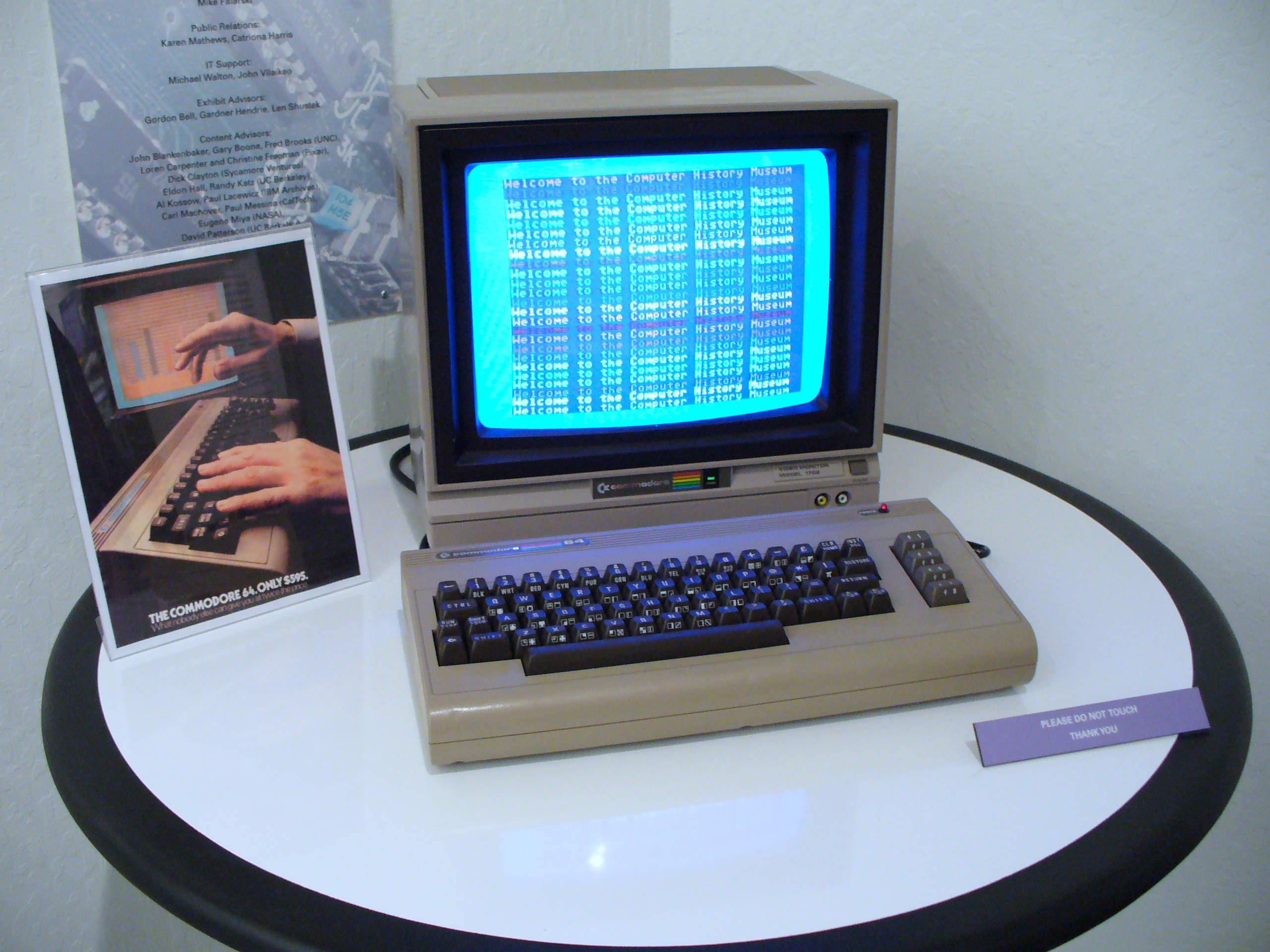
Commodore 64 at its 25th anniversary event at The Computer History Museum

=== 6502-based computers ===
(listed chronologically)

- KIM-1 – single-board computer (1976); was produced by MOS Technology, which was bought by Commodore
- Commodore PET/CBM range (1977)
- VIC-20 – a.k.a. VIC-1001 (1980 [VIC-1001] – 1984) (CBM);
- Commodore CBM-II range – a.k.a. B-range a.k.a. 600/700 range (1982–1984)
- Commodore 64 – including C64C (Aug. 1982–1994)
- MAX Machine – Japan-only home computer based on the Commodore 64, with extremely reduced specs (Dec. 1982)
- Educator 64 – 64 in a PET 40xx case (1983)
- Commodore SX-64 – all-in-one portable C64 including screen and disk drive (1984–1986)
- Commodore 16 – including C116, incompatible with C64 (1984)
- Plus/4 – compatible with C16 (1984–1985)
- Commodore LCD – LCD-equipped laptop (never released)
- Commodore 128 – including 128D and 128DCR (1985–1989)
- Commodore 65 – C64 successor (never released, an unofficial recreation was released as MEGA65)

=== Z8000-based ===
- Commodore 900 workstation (never released)

=== Amiga ===
- Amiga 1000 (1985–1987)
- Amiga 500 – incl. A500+ (1987–1991)
- Amiga 2000 – incl. A2000HD (1987–1991)
- Amiga 2500 (1988–1991)
- Amiga 1500 (1987–1991)
- Amiga 3000 – incl. Amiga 3000UX & Amiga 3000T (1990–1992)
- Amiga 4000 – incl. A4000T (1992–1994), rereleased by Escom (1995–1997)
- Amiga 600 (1992–1993)
- Amiga 1200 (1992–1994), rereleased by Escom (1995–1996)

=== x86 IBM PC compatibles ===
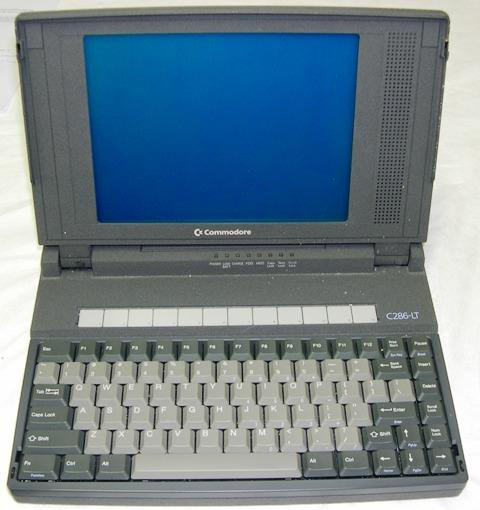
Commodore C286-LT laptop

- Commodore PC compatible systems – Commodore Colt, PC1, PC10, PC20, PC30, PC40 (1987–1993)
- Commodore PC laptops – Commodore 286LT, 386SX-LT, 486SX-LTC, 486SX-LTF, (–1993) Pentium P120i Ultramedia, P166i Ultramedia and the P200i Ultramedia (1996–1997)

=== Game consoles ===
- Commodore TV Game 2000K/3000H (1975–1977) (Commodore TV Game 2000K/3000H, 1st-gen home consoles list)
- Commodore 64 Games System (1990)
- Commodore CDTV (1990)
- Amiga CD32 (1993)

=== Monitors ===
1000, 1024, 1070, 1080, 1081, 1083S, 1084, 1084S, 1084ST, 1085S, 1201, 1402, 1403, 1404, 1405, 1407, 1428, 1428x, 1432D, 1432V, 1701, 1702, 1703, 1801, 1802, 1803, 1900M/DM602, 1901/75BM13/M1, 1902, 1902A, 1930, 1930-II, 1930-III, 1934, 1935, 1936, 1936ALR, 1940, 1942, 1950, 1960, 1962, 2002, A2024, 2080, 76M13, CM-141, DM-14, DM602

=== Printers ===
==== VIC 1520 plotter ====
The VIC 1520 plotter used the ALPS mechanicals and four-color rotary pen setup that scrolled a 4¼" roll of paper. The ALPS mechanism was shared with several other 8 bit computers of the era, including Tandy, Atari, and Apple.

=== Software ===
- AmigaOS – 32-bit operating system for the Amiga range; multitasking, micro kernel, with GUI
- Amiga Unix – Operating system for the Amiga, based on Unix System V Release 4
- Commodore BASIC – BASIC interpreter for the 8-bit range, ROM resident; based on Microsoft BASIC
- Commodore DOS – Disk operating system for the 8-bit range; embedded in disk drive ROMs
- KERNAL – Core OS routines for the 8-bit range; ROM resident
- Magic Desk – Planned series of productivity software for the C64; only the first entry was released
- Simons' BASIC – BASIC extension for the C64; cartridge-based
- Super Expander – BASIC and memory extension for the VIC-20; cartridge-based
- Super Expander 64 – BASIC extension for the C64
