= David Moody (writer) =

British writer

- Born: David John Moody; 19 November 1970 (age 55); Wordsley, Staffordshire, England
- Occupation: Horror writer
- Years active: 1996–present
- Known for: Autumn series Hater trilogy

David Moody (born 19 November 1970) is an English horror writer. He first came to public attention with his book Autumn, published freely on-line in 2001. Autumn was made into a motion picture starring David Carradine and Dexter Fletcher which was released in 2009. Film rights to Moody's Hater trilogy were picked up in 2008 by Universal Pictures, with Mark Johnson and Guillermo del Toro to produce and Juan Antonio Bayona to direct.

== Bibliography ==
=== Autumn ===
- Autumn (2001 – republished 2010)
- Autumn: The City (2003 – republished 2011)
- Autumn: Purification (2004 – republished 2011)
- Autumn: The Human Condition (2005 – republished 2013)
- Autumn: Disintegration (2011)
- Autumn: Aftermath (2012)
- Autumn: Dawn (2021 – book one of the London trilogy)
- Autumn: Inferno (2022 – book two of the London trilogy)
- Autumn: Exodus (2023 – book three of the London trilogy)

=== Hater ===
1. Hater (2006)
2. Dog Blood (2010)
3. Them or Us (2011)
4. One of Us Will Be Dead by Morning (2017)
5. All Roads End Here (2019)
6. Chokehold (2019)

=== Other works ===
- Straight to You (1996 – republished 2014)
- Trust (2005 – republished 2012)
- Joe & Me (2012)
- The Cost of Living (2014)
- Isolation (2014)
- Last of the Living (2014 - republished 2025)
- Strangers (2014 - republished 2025)
- The Front: Red Devils (2017)
- The Last Big Thing (2019)
- Shadowlocked (2024)
- Kemberton (2026)
