= Rumbelows =

UK electrical and electronics retailer

- Type: Private
- Industry: Electrical retailing
- Founded: 1949
- Founder: Sydney Rumbelow
- Defunct: 1995

Rumbelows was an electrical and electronics retailer in the United Kingdom that once rivalled Currys, Dixons and Comet.

== History ==
The company was established in 1949 by Sydney Rumbelow when he opened his first shop in Hatfield, Hertfordshire. The chain was extended to more shops throughout the 1950s, before being acquired by Thorn Electrical Industries in the early 1960s. In 1969, Thorn extended the Rumbelows name across other regional chains it had bought, including Fred Dawes, NEMS and Strothers. In 1975, J & F Stone was purchased from Great Universal Stores and added to the chain. Centralised control was established from the Nantwich, Cheshire, headquarters.

Several of the former Strothers and NEMS stores also sold records, musical instruments and hifi equipment. The Rumbelows store in Whitechapel, Liverpool had previously been the NEMS music store in the 1960s, when it was run by Brian Epstein, manager of the Beatles.

=== Demise ===
In 1989 the business was sold to Radio Rentals, which had merged with Thorn Electrical Industries the previous year. Thorn EMI (as Thorn Electrical Industries had become) transferred all of Rumbelows’ rental accounts to its Radio Rentals chain, bolstering its market position. With its core business removed, Rumbelows sought a new identity as a more conventional non-rental retailer, adding home computers to the product mix.

In 1992, Thorn converted some of the remaining Rumbelows shops into DER, Multibroadcast or Radio Rentals branches. Some stores were also converted to the Fona brand, franchised from a Danish electrical retailer and marketed as "The electrical store from Denmark", with adverts starring Brigitte Nielsen.

By the 1990s, the business was making losses and Thorn closed the remaining 285 Rumbelows shops and 36 Fona stores in 1995. Rumbelows had been losing £12 million yearly, and had never made a profit in its 24 years of existence. Some stores were sold to Escom, a German PC retail chain, but Escom itself folded in 1998. In the 1980s, Martin Dawes (born c. 1945) carried on the family name in the electrical and electronic retailing sector, with his mobile phone business, which he then sold to Cellnet in March 1999 for £130 million.

== Football sponsorship ==
From 1990 to 1992, Rumbelows was the title sponsor of the English Football League Cup, an association football professional competition.
