= Atlantic Acceptance Corporation =

Former Canadian finance company

Atlantic Acceptance Corporation, Ltd. was an Oakville, Ontario-based finance company. It collapsed in June 1965 in one of the biggest financial scandals in Canada at that time, with an estimated $65 million loss to investors.

== Background ==
Atlantic Acceptance was a finance company specializing in commercial, real estate and auto loans. It began business in 1953 and was eventually headed by Campbell Powell Morgan, a chartered accountant living in Toronto's Lawrence Park district.

Control of Atlantic came to be held by Lambert International, headed by financier Jean Lambert. The company experienced fast growth in the early 1960s, with sales increasing from $25 million in 1960 to $176 million in 1964. It became the sixth largest sales finance company in Canada in 1965, with assets of $150 million.

Through Lambert's connections on Wall Street, the company attracted loans from major banks, pension funds, universities and other investors such as United States Steel and Carnegie Pension Fund, Ford Foundation, Princeton University, University of Pennsylvania, National Lead Company, First National City Bank of New York and Morgan Guaranty Trust Company. Atlantic Acceptance also held a large stake in Commodore Business Machines, and had three directors on the board of Commodore.

== Downfall ==
Atlantic made a number of high-risk and poorly-documented loans. This included a $10 million loan to the mob-connected Lucayan Beach Hotel and Casino in the Bahamas, controlled by Louis Chesler and Wallace Groves, and secured only by stock in the resort. Atlantic Acceptance also issued misleading financial statements, and there were conflicts of interest by Morgan and by the outside auditors (Wagman, Fruitman & Lando). The company began having liquidity problems. A $5 million cheque issued by the company to redeem some borrowings bounced on June 14, 1965, with the company being placed into receivership three days later.

== Aftermath ==
A Royal Commission of Ontario began an investigation of Atlantic's collapse in 1966, chaired by Samuel Hughes QC. Morgan co-operated by giving in-depth interviews from his St. Michael's Hospital bed during his futile bout with leukemia.

A four-volume report was issued in December 1969.

The investment house Lambert & Company, owned by Jean Lambert, closed its doors. William Pike, the mortgage manager of British Mortgage and Trust Company, was found guilty of accepting bribes and sentenced to two months in jail. Accountants William Walton and Harry Wagman were convicted of theft and conspiracy to defraud in 1967 and sentenced to two years in prison. Attorney Donald Reid was convicted of bribery and sentenced to one year in prison. British Mortgage and Trust Company, which was a creditor of and an investor in Atlantic Acceptance, was rescued by the Ontario government. That intervention was considered the impetus for the creation of the Canada Deposit Insurance Corporation in 1967.

== Morgan's death ==
Campbell Powell Morgan died of leukemia at the age of 56 in October 1966.

He was survived by his mother Sarah and sisters Ruth & Dorothy. He also left his widow Mildred (53, died 1996), son Campbell Powell (23, died 1987), daughter Beverly Lu (28, died 2014) and grandson Andrew (4) -- all of Toronto.

His grandchildren Christina, Randy, and Ryan would be born in 1971, 1975, and 1977 respectively, and all reside in Toronto.
