= Escom AG =

German computer company

- Company type: Aktiengesellschaft
- Industry: Computers
- Founded: 1986
- Defunct: 15 July 1996
- Fate: Bankruptcy and Liquidation
- Headquarters: Germany
- Key people: Manfred Schmitt, Founder
- Products: Computers, ICT
- Brands: Commodore International
- Website: escom.de at the Wayback Machine (archived 1996-11-04)

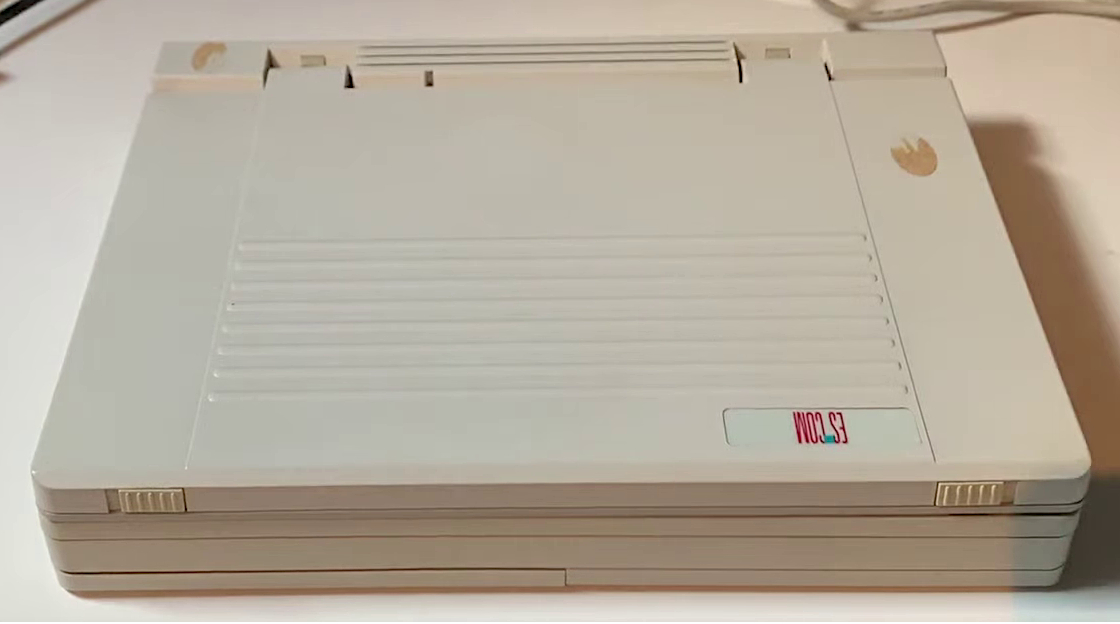
Escom Greymate 486 laptop

Escom AG (stylized in uppercase; previously Schmitt Computer Systems) was a German computer company, best known as the successful purchaser of Commodore International and the Amiga trademarks in 1995.

Escom was founded by Manfred Schmitt of Darmstadt, West Germany as the computer division of his music company in 1986. It became a separate company in 1991. In 1993, it became a publicly traded company, and it grew rapidly, controlling 11.2% of the market of German PCs by 1994.

During 1992 and 1993, a British operation was set up with a distribution and assembly base in Irvine, North Ayrshire and a small number of retail stores. These followed the model established in Germany, with small town centre shops which would customise PCs to order, rather than the out of town superstores and mail order businesses which dominated the market in the United Kingdom.

In February 1995, Escom's retail presence on the high streets of the United Kingdom suddenly expanded massively, when it took over many branches of the Rumbelows electrical chain, which were being sold off by Rumbelows owner Thorn EMI. Also in April 1995, Escom bought Commodore International for US$14 million, primarily to get the Commodore and Amiga brand names.

Escom was one of two companies to bid for the Commodore and Amiga Brand names and assets. They won the bidding process against Dell and Creative Electronics International. Many other companies were involved in the buyout but did not bid such as Commodore UK and Samsung. It started using the Commodore name on computers sold in Europe, and established a separate division for Amiga related technologies.

The company grew too quickly, however, and lost 185 million Deutsche Mark that year. With no bailout from its shareholders, the company declared bankruptcy on 15 July 1996, and was liquidated. The Commodore trademarks were purchased the following year by Tulip Computers, while the remaining trademarks, together with the full set of patents, copyrights and other intellectual property, were acquired by Gateway 2000.
