= Precision (computer science) =

Measure of detail a quantity is expressed in

In computer science, the precision of a numerical quantity is a measure of the detail in which the quantity is expressed. This is usually measured in bits, but sometimes in decimal digits. It is related to precision in mathematics, which describes the number of digits that are used to express a value.

Some of the standardized floating-point precision formats are:

- Half-precision floating-point format
- Single-precision floating-point format
- Double-precision floating-point format
- Quadruple-precision floating-point format
- Octuple-precision floating-point format

Of these, octuple-precision format is rarely used. The names refer to the size of a computer word, commonly 32-bits on many current computer architectures. A single-precision value occupies one word, a half-precision half of a word, double-precision two words, etc. The single- and double-precision formats are most widely used and supported on nearly all platforms. The use of half-precision format and minifloat formats has been increasing especially in the field of machine learning since many machine learning algorithms are inherently error-tolerant.

== Rounding errors ==
Precision is often the source of rounding errors in computation. The number of bits used to store a number will often cause some loss of accuracy. An example would be to store "sin(0.1)" in IEEE single-precision floating point standard. The error is then often magnified as subsequent computations are made using the data (although it can also be reduced).

== See also ==
- Approximate computing
- Arbitrary-precision arithmetic
- Extended precision
- Granularity
- IEEE754 (IEEE floating point standard)
- Integer (computer science)
- Minifloat (8-bit and less)
- Significant figures
- Truncation
