= Sochacki =

Polish surname

Sochacki (feminine: Sochacka; plural: Sochaccy) is a Polish surname. Notable people with this surname include:

- Anna Sochacka (1932–2020), Polish speed skater
- James Sochacki, American mathematician who developed the Parker–Sochacki method
- Jerzy Czeszejko-Sochacki (1892–1933), Polish politician
