= Unit in the last place =

Floating-point accuracy metric

In computer science and numerical analysis, unit in the last place or unit of least precision (ulp) is the spacing between two consecutive floating-point numbers, i.e., the value the least significant digit (rightmost digit) represents if it is 1. It is used as a measure of accuracy in numeric calculations.

== Definition ==
The most common definition is: In radix $b$ with precision $p$, if $b^e \le |x| < b^{e+1}$, then $\operatorname{ulp}(x) = b^{\max \{ e, \, e_\min \} - p + 1}$, where $e_\min$ is the minimal exponent of the normal numbers. In particular, $\operatorname{ulp}(x) = b^{e - p + 1}$ for normal numbers, and $\operatorname{ulp}(x) = b^{e_\min - p + 1}$ for subnormals.

Another definition, suggested by John Harrison, is slightly different: $\operatorname{ulp}(x)$ is the distance between the two closest straddling floating-point numbers $a$ and $b$ (i.e., satisfying $a \le x \le b$ and $a \neq b$), assuming that the exponent range is not upper-bounded. These definitions differ only at signed powers of the radix.

== Examples ==
=== Example 1 ===
Let $x$ be a positive floating-point number and assume that the active rounding mode is round to nearest, ties to even, denoted $\operatorname{RN}$. If $\operatorname{ulp}(x) \le 1$, then $\operatorname{RN} (x + 1) > x$. Otherwise, $\operatorname{RN} (x + 1) = x$ or $\operatorname{RN} (x + 1) = x + \operatorname{ulp}(x)$, depending on the value of the least significant digit and the exponent of $x$. This is demonstrated in the following Haskell code typed at an interactive prompt:

> until (\x -> x == x+1) (+1) 0 :: Float
1.6777216e7
> it-1
1.6777215e7
> it+1
1.6777216e7

Here we start with 0 in single precision (binary32) and repeatedly add 1 until the operation does not change the value. Since the significand for a single-precision number contains 24 bits, the first integer that is not exactly representable is 2^{24}+1, and this value rounds to 2^{24} in round to nearest, ties to even. Thus the result is equal to 2^{24}.

=== Example 2 ===
The following example in Java approximates π as a floating-point value by finding the two double values bracketing $\pi$: $p_0 < \pi < p_1$.

// π with 20 decimal digits
BigDecimal π = new BigDecimal("3.14159265358979323846");

// truncate to a double floating point
double p0 = π.doubleValue();
// -> 3.141592653589793  (hex: 0x1.921fb54442d18p1)

// p0 is smaller than π, so find next number representable as double
double p1 = Math.nextUp(p0);
// -> 3.1415926535897936 (hex: 0x1.921fb54442d19p1)

Then $\operatorname{ulp}(\pi)$ is determined as $\operatorname{ulp}(\pi) = p_1 - p_0$.

// ulp(π) is the difference between p1 and p0
BigDecimal ulp = new BigDecimal(p1).subtract(new BigDecimal(p0));
// -> 4.44089209850062616169452667236328125E-16
// (this is precisely 2**(-51))

// same result when using the standard library function
double ulpMath = Math.ulp(p0);
// -> 4.440892098500626E-16 (hex: 0x1.0p-51)

=== Example 3 ===
Another example, in Python, also typed at an interactive prompt, is:

>>> x = 1.0
>>> p = 0
>>> while x != x + 1:
...   x = x * 2
...   p = p + 1
... 
>>> x
9007199254740992.0
>>> p
53
>>> x + 2 + 1
9007199254740996.0

In this case, we start with x = 1 and repeatedly double it until x = x + 1. Similarly to Example 1, the result is 2^{53} because the double-precision floating-point format uses a 53-bit significand.

== Relevance ==
The IEEE 754 specification—followed by all modern floating-point hardware—requires that the result of an elementary arithmetic operation (addition, subtraction, multiplication, division, and square root since 1985, and FMA since 2008) be correctly rounded, which implies that in rounding to nearest, the rounded result is within 0.5 ulp of the mathematically exact result, using John Harrison's definition; conversely, this property implies that the distance between the rounded result and the mathematically exact result is minimized (but for the halfway cases, it is satisfied by two consecutive floating-point numbers). Reputable numerical libraries compute the basic transcendental functions to between 0.5 and about 1 ulp (in practice, a probabilistic statement: common examples are 0.51 ulp and 0.501 ulp, corresponding to an incorrect rounding out of 100 and 1000 random floating-point inputs respectively). Only a few libraries compute them within 0.5 ulp, this problem being complex due to the table-maker's dilemma.

Since the 2010s, advances in floating-point mathematics have allowed correctly rounded transcendental functions to be almost as fast in average as these earlier, less accurate functions. These functions generally employ Ziv's 1991 "onion-peeling" strategy, in which a function first computes a fast approximation, then checks whether a more accurate method is required for correct rounding. What makes this strategy practical is that advances in both algorithms and computing power allows identification of the "breakpoints" where a function transitions from correctly-rounded to otherwise, therefore reducing the "hardness to round" identified in the table-maker's dilemma.

IEEE 754-2019 requires that its recommended arithmetic operations (which includes the transcendental functions) be correctly-rounded if present, an important departure from IEEE 754-2008 which introduced most of them.

== Language support ==
The Boost C++ libraries provides the functions boost::math::float_next, boost::math::float_prior, boost::math::nextafter and boost::math::float_advance to obtain nearby (and distant) floating-point values, and boost::math::float_distance(a, b) to calculate the floating-point distance between two doubles.

The C language library provides functions to calculate the next floating-point number in some given direction: nextafterf and nexttowardf for float, nextafter and nexttoward for double, nextafterl and nexttowardl for long double, declared in <math.h>. It also provides the macros FLT_EPSILON, DBL_EPSILON, LDBL_EPSILON, which represent the positive difference between 1.0 and the next greater representable number in the corresponding type (i.e. the ulp of one).

The Go standard library provides the functions math.Nextafter (for 64 bit floats) and math.Nextafter32 (for 32 bit floats) both of which return the next representable floating-point value towards another provided floating-point value.

The Java standard library provides the functions Math.ulp(double) and Math.ulp(float). They were introduced with Java 1.5.

The Swift standard library provides access to the next floating-point number in some given direction via the instance properties nextDown and nextUp. It also provides the instance property ulp and the type property ulpOfOne (which corresponds to C macros like FLT_EPSILON) for Swift's floating-point types.

== See also ==
- IEEE 754
- ISO/IEC 10967, part 1 requires an ulp function
- Least significant bit (LSB)
- Machine epsilon
- Round-off error

== Bibliography ==
- Goldberg, David (1991–03). "Rounding Error" in "What Every Computer Scientist Should Know About Floating-Point Arithmetic". Computing Surveys, ACM, March 1991. Retrieved from https://docs.oracle.com/cd/E19957-01/806-3568/ncg_goldberg.html#689.
- Muller, Jean-Michel (2010). Handbook of floating-point arithmetic. Boston: Birkhäuser. pp. 32–37. ISBN 978-0-8176-4704-9.
