= Long double =

Floating-point data type in C family languages

In C and related programming languages, long double refers to a floating-point data type that is often more precise than double precision though the language standard only requires it to be at least as precise as double. As with C's other floating-point types, it may not necessarily map to an IEEE format.

== History ==
The long double type was present in the original 1989 C standard, but support was improved by the 1999 revision of the C standard, or C99, which extended the standard library to include functions operating on long double such as sinl() and strtold().

Long double constants are floating-point constants suffixed with "L" or "l" (lower-case L), e.g., 0.3333333333333333333333333333333333L or 3.1415926535897932384626433832795029L for quadruple precision. Without a suffix, the evaluation depends on FLT_EVAL_METHOD.

== Implementations ==
On the x86 architecture, most C compilers implement long double as the 80-bit extended precision type supported by x86 hardware (generally stored as 12 or 16 bytes to maintain data structure alignment), as specified in the C99 / C11 standards (IEC 60559 floating-point arithmetic (Annex F)). An exception is Microsoft Visual C++ for x86 (starting at 32-bit versions), which makes long double a synonym for double. The Intel C++ compiler on Microsoft Windows supports extended precision, but requires the /Qlong‑double switch for long double to correspond to the hardware's extended precision format.

Compilers may also use long double for the IEEE 754 quadruple-precision binary floating-point format (binary128). This is the case on HP-UX, Solaris/SPARC, MIPS with the 64-bit or n32 ABI, 64-bit ARM (AArch64) (on operating systems using the standard AAPCS calling conventions, such as Linux), and z/OS with FLOAT(IEEE). Most implementations are in software, but some processors have hardware support.

On some PowerPC systems, long double is implemented as a double-double arithmetic, where a long double value is regarded as the exact sum of two double-precision values, giving at least a 106-bit precision; with such a format, the long double type does not conform to the IEEE floating-point standard. Otherwise, long double is simply a synonym for double (double precision), e.g. on 32-bit ARM, 64-bit ARM (AArch64) (on Windows and macOS) and on 32-bit MIPS (old ABI, a.k.a. o32).

With the GNU C Compiler, long double is 80-bit extended precision on x86 processors regardless of the physical storage used for the type (which can be either 96 or 128 bits), On some other architectures, long double can be double-double (e.g. on PowerPC) or 128-bit quadruple precision (e.g. on SPARC). As of gcc 4.3, a quadruple precision is also supported on x86, but as the nonstandard type __float128 rather than long double.

Although the x86 architecture, and specifically the x87 floating-point instructions on x86, supports 80-bit extended-precision operations, it is possible to configure the processor to automatically round the output of the following operations to double (or even single) precision: addition, subtraction, multiplication, division and square root; register load operations, absolute value, remainder, scaling, exponentiation, logarithm, trigonometric operations, etc. always use the 80-bit extended precision. Conversely, in extended-precision mode, extended precision may be used for intermediate compiler-generated calculations even when the final results are stored at a lower precision (i.e. FLT_EVAL_METHOD == 2). With gcc on Linux, 80-bit extended precision is the default; on several BSD operating systems (FreeBSD and OpenBSD), double-precision mode is the default, and long double operations are effectively reduced to double precision. (NetBSD 7.0 and later, however, defaults to 80-bit extended precision). However, it is possible to override this within an individual program via the FLDCW "floating-point load control-word" instruction. On x86_64, the BSDs default to 80-bit extended precision. Microsoft Windows with Visual C++ also sets the processor in double-precision mode by default, but this can again be overridden within an individual program (e.g. by the _controlfp_s function in Visual C++). The Intel C++ Compiler for x86, on the other hand, enables extended-precision mode by default. On IA-32 OS X, long double is 80-bit extended precision.

== Other specifications ==
In CORBA (from specification of 3.0, which uses "ANSI/IEEE Standard 754-1985" as its reference), "the long double data type represents an IEEE double-extended floating-point number, which has an exponent of at least 15 bits in length and a signed fraction of at least 64 bits", with GIOP/IIOP CDR, whose floating-point types "exactly follow the IEEE standard formats for floating point numbers", marshalling this as what seems to be IEEE 754-2008 binary128 a.k.a. quadruple precision without using that name.

== See also ==
- Quadruple precision
- Extended precision
