= Amiga productivity software =

Type of software for Amiga computers

Amiga productivity software is productivity software created for the Amiga line of computers and the AmigaOS operating system and its derivatives AROS and MorphOS.

== History ==
The Amiga originally supported software titles such as WordPerfect, Deluxe Paint, and Lattice C. Video Toaster, one of the first all-in-one graphics and video editing packages, began on the Amiga. Video Toaster was one of the few accessories for the "big box" Amigas (2000, 3000 and 4000) that used the video slot and enabled users to turn their Amiga into the core of a video production suite. The later development of Video Flyer by NewTek made possible the Amiga's first non-linear video editing program. The Amiga made 3D raytracing graphics available to the masses with Sculpt 3D. Before the Amiga, raytracing was only available for dedicated graphics workstations such as SGI. TurboSilver was another package designed to support raytracing. The Amiga was well known for its 3D rendering, with many titles added over the years. Some titles were later ported to Microsoft Windows, such as the rendering software Cinema 4D from Maxon, and NewTek's LightWave, which was originally part of Video Toaster. Video Toaster was also ported to Windows. LightWave was used for low-cost computer-generated special effects during the early 1990s, with Babylon 5 a notable example of a television series utilizing LightWave. AmigaBASIC was an advanced BASIC software development environment, complete with an integrated development environment (IDE), was written by Microsoft under contract.Integrated productivity packages were also available for the Amiga. Gold Disk Office combined word processing, spreadsheet calculation, database management, desktop publishing, and business graphics in a single package.

== Graphics software ==
Amiga began in 1985 with strong graphics capabilities, using its unique hardware and multimedia chipset to provide better graphics support and capability than other personal computers. The Agnus graphical chip could directly access RAM and pilot it with Direct Memory Access, and featured Bit Blitter and Copper circuits capable of moving ranges of pixels on the screen and directly controlling the electron gun in a CRT monitor. It could render screens in various color and resolution modes (2, 4, 8, 16, 32, 64, and 4096 color HAM modes) starting from 320x200 up to 720x576 pixel graphic pages. Amiga released many graphics software programs, such as Graphicraft, Deluxe Paint, TVPaint, Photon Paint, Brilliance!, Aegis Images, ArtEffect, fxPAINT by IOSpirit, Personal Paint from Cloanto, Photogenics, Express Paint, Digi Paint, XiPaint, PerfectPaint, and SketchBlock 24 bit painting program by Andy Broad for AmigaOS 4.x.

=== Graphic applications on AmigaOne systems ===
Unlike Commodore Amiga systems, AmigaOne systems had no integrated multimedia chipsets. Instead, these systems, similar to Mac or PC, sported AGP/PCIe graphic cards, an embedded audio AC'97 sound system, and can use PCI/PCIe audio cards, including some professional models. The expanded capability of the system's faster CPU, and the availability of standard expansion graphic cards, led to a new generation of graphic software for the AmigaOne machines such as Hollywood "Visual Programming Suite". This made it easy to port open-source software like Blender.

=== Visual programming ===
The Hollywood suite of programs by German software house Airsoft SoftWair is a multimedia and presentation program available for all Amiga systems (AmigaOS, MorphOS, AROS) and as of 2010, a version of Hollywood became available for Microsoft Windows. It can load Scala projects and Microsoft PowerPoint ".PPT" files. Hollywood Designer is a multimedia authoring tool and a complete cross-platform multimedia application layer capable of creating whole Amiga programs through a Visual design approach. It can save executables in various formats: 68k Amiga, WarpUP, AmigaOS 4 and MorphOS executables, and Intel X86 code for AROS. Later versions allowed for creating executable programs for Intel Windows machines, as well as Mac OS X for both PPC and Intel processors.

=== Modern graphic software ===
Fairly modern graphic software wsa available for AmigaOne machines. TV Paint was released in 1991, and was one of the first commercial 32-bit graphics applications. The final version for Amiga (3.59) was released in 1994, although the source code was proprietary. Programs such as Candy Factory for AOS 4.0 created special effects for images, brushes, and fonts, which could be used to create internet objects and buttons. Pixel image editor (formerly Pixel32) is available for MorphOS. Blender, a prominent 3D graphics software, supported Amiga systems. Beginning with release 2.1 in 2008, MorphOS ed its Paint utility called Sketch, and AROS bundled the last free version of Luna Paint with it, which became a commercial paint program.

=== Graphic utilities ===
The Amiga software ecosystem included graphic utilities. For example, Amiga systems supported professional software utilities such as Cinematte, CineMorph, Morph Plus, Impact!, Essence, Magic Lantern, and Pixel 3D Pro. Cinematte allowed the user to make complex photo-realistic composites of subjects photographed against a bluescreen. It used the same techniques as motion picture technology for precise compositing. CineMorph and Morph Plus were programs used to automatically create morphing effects between two original images, and create a compound third image, including animations associated with the morphing effect. Impact! created physics simulation in 3D scenes. Essence was a texture maker used to apply textures on the surfaces of objects created by 3D tracing programs. Amiga Magic Lantern was a true color animation compressor and player for the Amiga. Pixel 3D Pro was used to create models for 3D objects and save them in various 3D file formats, or to transform any model object from one 3D file format to another.

=== Vector graphics ===
The most widely used formats for vector graphics in Amiga were EPS and IFF DR2D. This originated from the fact that Amiga was the first platform that natively ran Ghostscript. IFF DR2D was the original standard for vector graphics generated by Amiga ProVector and was later adopted by applications such as Art Expression and Professional Draw. The most-used Amiga drawing and vector graphics utilities were Aegis Draw, ProDraw (Professional Draw) from Gold Disk Inc., DrawStudio, Art Expression, ProVector, and for some basic vector graphics, also the tools of Professional Page and PageStream. The most modern vector graphics programs on Amiga were MindSpace 1.1, which is aimed mainly at design flowcharts, mindtables, UML and diagrams, and Steam Draw, a simple 2D vector paint program available for MorphOS.

==== Flash and SWF ====
SWFTools is a collection of command line programs to convert and save various raster (bitmap) image formats from and to Flash SWF vector animation format.

==== Tracing software ====
AmigaOS featured free distributable vector-to-graphics conversion facilities Autotrace, Potrace, and XTrace, which also run in the AROS Amiga open source clone system and MorphOS Amiga-Like systems. The desktop publishing software PageStream came bundled with tracing software. The structured drawing program ProVector had an optional add-on tracing utility named StylusTracer.

==== DXF, EMF, SVG file formats ====
Various programs read DXF (almost all Amiga CAD programs), EMF, SVG, CGM, GEM, WMF. An example of a converting tool that reads many formats and outputs DR2D is the Amiga program MetaView. SVG Datatype was supported directly in the OS, on any program, allowing the user to load and save files in the SVG (Scalable Vector Graphics) format.

== Computer aided design ==
When Amiga was first released, it was considered to offer the most powerful graphics platform available at a reasonable price. Various CAD programs were available for it, such as X-CAD, IntelliCAD, DynaCaDD, MaxonCAD, IntroCAD, and ElektroCAD (a program to design and test electronic circuits).

== Animation, comics and cartoons ==
Due to the Amiga's specific multimedia capabilities as well as the features of the bit blitter circuit, it was capable of advanced animation and video production at a professional level in the 1980s and thus seeded the creation of software for the professional video editing market. Many animation programs were available, including Aegis Animator, Lights!Camera!Action!, DeLuxe Video, Disney Animation Studio, Deluxe Paint (version 3 and newer), The Director (a BASIC-like language oriented to animation), Fantavision, Scala, Vision from Commodore itself, VisualFX from ClassX, Adorage Multi Effect program from proDAD, Millennium from Nova Design, ImageFX, and Art Department Pro.

Comic Setter was a tool for creating printed comics by arranging brushes representing comic characters, joining it with background images, and superimposing the right frames and "balloons" with their own text speech and captions. It could then print the comics that were created in color.

Disney Animation Studio was one of the most powerful 2D animation programs. Released on Amiga, this program was equipped with a complete cell-frame preview feature that was used by many animation studios. (Note: An interview to Italian Cartoon Studio Strane Mani is available at Amiworld.it (in Italian). Archived 2011-07-22 at the Wayback Machine) The software is mainly used by independent and amateur animators.

== 3D modeling, rendering and animation ==
Amiga 3D rendering and animation software includes Sculpt 3D, TurboSilver, Aladdin4D, Videoscape 3D, Caligari, Maxon Cinema4D, Imagine, LightWave from NewTek, Real3D from Realsoft, Vista Pro, World Construction Set 3D terrain rendering programs, and Tornado3D by the Italian company Eyelight.

== Amateur and professional video editing ==
Amiga was one of the first commercial platforms to allow amateur and professional video editing, due to its ability to connect to television sets and video codecs and deal with chroma key, genlock signal, at full screen with overscan features, and a good noise-gain ratio. In the 1990s, Amiga and its video peripherals (mainly Genlock boxes and digitizing boxes) were available at reasonable prices, which led Amiga to become a leading platform for professional video editing. It was capable of dealing with broadcast video production (NewTek VideoToaster), and from approximately 1992–1994, despite the demise of Commodore, Amiga experienced a golden age as a professional video platform and there were available for Amiga a vast amount of any kind of video software, graphic facilities and reselling of any of GFX and image gallery data files that could be applied to video productions. Amongst this software were the main Amiga video-editing programs for desktop video with both linear and non-linear editing with 4.2.2 capabilities as the ones from NewTek available with VideoToaster Flyer external module for Video Toaster and just called NLE! (Non-Linear Editing), Amiga MainActor, Broadcaster 32 and Elite (with Producer software), Wildfire by Andreas Maschke for vfx (now in Java), expansion Amiga cards PAR, VLab Motion (with Movieshop software) and VLab Pro.

== Word processing and page layout ==
While desktop video proved to be a major market, a surge of word processing, page layout and graphics software filled other professional needs. The first Amiga text program, Textcraft, was part word processor and part text editor, capable of changing page layouts, fonts, enlarging or reducing their width, changing their colors, and adding color images to the text.

Word processing programs for Amiga included the then-industry standard WordPerfect up to version 4.1, Shakespeare, Excellence, Maxon Word, Final Writer, Amiga Writer, Scribble!, ProWrite, Wordworth, and Personal Write by Cloanto.

Page layout software included Page Setter and Professional Page from Gold Disk Inc., and PageStream by Soft-Logik, (known today as Grasshopper LLC). Only PageStream was ported to other platforms. Graphics software included vector drawing applications like Art Expression from Soft-Logik, ProVector by Stylus, Inc. (formerly Taliesin), Draw Studio, and Professional Draw from Gold Disk Inc.

Amiga lacked an office suite, but integrated software was available. Pen Pal was a word processor integrated with a database and a form editor. Scribble!, Analyze!, and Organize! were bundled together as the Works! suite combining a word processor, spreadsheet, and database. Despite the similar name, it had no connection to Microsoft Works.

LaTeX was available in two ports: AmigaTeX, which is no longer available (the first LaTeX can be edited with a front-end program), and PasTEX, available on Aminet repository.

Modern software AbiWord was available on AmigaOS 4.0 through the AmiCygnix X11 graphical engine, Scriba and Papyrus Office pre-release is available for MorphOS.

=== Text editors ===
Text editors available on Amiga included Vim, Emacs and MicroEMACS (included), Cinnamon Writer, Cygnus Editor (also known as CED), and GoldED, which then evolved in 2006 into Cubic IDE. The UNIX ne editor and the vi-clone Vim were initially developed on the Amiga.

Since 2001, in MorphOS, a limited-edition version of GoldEd called MorphEd is available, and since 2008 Cinnamon Writer and NoWin ED, a universal editor which ran on any Amiga-like platform, were available.

== Database and spreadsheets ==
In the early years (1986–1989) cross-platform spreadsheets were available, such as MaxiPlan, which was available also for MS-DOS and Macintosh; Logistix (stylized as LoGisTiX), one of the first spreadsheets for Amiga; Microfiche Filer Plus was a database that enabled users to examine data using microfilm. Superbase was one of the finest programs available for C64. It was then ported on Atari, Amiga, and later on PC. But on Amiga, it became a standard reference, available as Superbase Personal and Superbase Professional. It could handle SQL databases and had an internal query language such as BASIC. It was capable of creating forms and masks on records and handling multimedia files into its records years before Microsoft Access. Superbase featured VCR-style buttons to browse database records. Softwood File II was another multimedia database that then evolved into Final Data, from Softwood Inc. From the same firm came Final Calc, a spreadsheet similar to TurboCalc from German company Schatztruhe. ProChart was a tool to draw flow charts and diagrams. Analyze! was another spreadsheet developed for the Amiga. Organize! was a flat-file database package. Gnumeric spreadsheet was ported on Amiga through an X11 engine called AmiCygnix.

In recent times, MUIbase was a mainly cross-platform MySQL database language that became a reference on Amiga. SQLite, a self-contained, embeddable, zero-configuration SQL database engine, runs on AmigaOS 4 and MorphOS.

In February 2010, Italian programmer Andrea Palmatè ported IODBC standard to AmigaOS 4.

== Science, entertainment and special use programs ==
Maple is a general-purpose mathematics software (a.k.a. Mathematic-CAD) that was available for Amiga up to version "V". Distant Suns, Galileo, Digital Almanac and Amiga Digital Universe (from Bill Eaves for the OS4) were astronomy programs and astronomic calculators. During the age of CDTV, many history, science, and art CDs like Timetable of Science, Innovation, Timetable of Business, Politics, Grolier's Encyclopedia, Guinness Disk of Records, Video Creator, American Heritage Dictionary, Illustrated Holy Bible, Illustrated Works of Shakespeare, etc. were available.

=== Fractals, virtual reality, artificial intelligence ===
ZoneXplorer from Elena Novaretti is a fractal experience program. In 1989, the X-Specs 3D Glasses from Haitex Resources, one of the first interactive 3D solutions for home computers were created. Also created on Amiga, were the multimedia interactive TV non-immersive virtual reality exploring software Mandala from Vivid Group Inc., (Note: Info on Virtuality at Amiga Hardware site) and the Virtuality System Virtuality 1000 CS 3D VRML all-immersive simulator from W-Industries (then Virtuality Inc.), for game entertainment in big arcade installations and theme parks, based on A3000.

Magellan v.1.1 (Artificial Intelligence Software), not the same as Directory Opus Magellan, was a program to emulate artificial intelligence responses, by creating heuristic rules based on machine learning in its form of supervised learning. The user chooses decision trees and decision tables system featured by the Magellan program, in which to input objects, and desired outputs and describe all associate conditions and rules which the machine should follow in order to output pseudo-intelligent solutions to given problems.

=== Route planning ===
AmiATLAS v.6 was a route planner tool. It provided worldwide interactive maps and found optimal routes for traveling from one place to another. It featured multiple map loading, an integrated CityGuide-System with information on interesting places, some with pictures.

=== Personal organizer, notebook, diary software ===
Digita Organizer v.1.1 from Digita International was an Amiga personal organizer program. PolyOrga by Frédéric Rignault is a similar program for MorphOS.

=== Personal budget, home banking, accounts ===
Packages included Easy Banker, Home Accounts, Small Business Accounts, Small Business Manager, Account Master, Accountant, AmigaMoney, Banca Base III, HomeBank, CashMaster, and Counting House.

=== Special purpose ===
AVT (Amiga Video Transceiver), was a software and hardware slow-scan television system originally developed by "Black Belt Systems" (USA) around 1990. It was popular before the IBM PC family gained sufficient audio quality.

Richmond Sound Design (RSD) created both show control (a.k.a. MSC or "MIDI Show Control") and theatre sound design software that was used in the theatre, theme park, display, exhibit, stage management, and themed entertainment industries in the 1980s and 1990s. During the mid 1990s, many high-profile shows at major theme parks worldwide were controlled by Amigas, using Stage Manager. Dozens of Amigas were used at Walt Disney World and more at other theme parks as well as venues in Las Vegas, on Broadway, London's West End, the Royal Shakespeare Company's many venues, most of Branson, Missouri's theatres, and on cruise ships.

== See also ==
- Amiga Internet and communications software
- Amiga music software
- Amiga programming languages
- Amiga support and maintenance software for other information regarding software that runs on Amiga.
