= Aminet =

Archive of Amiga-related software and files

- Website type: Software-archive, Repository for Amiga-related software
- Founded: 1991; 35 years ago
- Country of origin: Switzerland
- Founder: Students of ICU at University of Zurich
- Editors: Christoph Gutjahr, Nicolas Mendoza
- Key people: Urban Dominik Müller, Christoph Gutjahr, Nicolas Mendoza, Matthias Scheler
- Website: www.aminet.net
- Registration: no
- Launched: FTP-site: January 1992; 34 years ago; Web-site: May 1994; 32 years ago
- Current status: online

Aminet is the world's largest archive of Amiga-related software and files. Aminet was originally hosted by several universities' FTP sites, and is now available on CD-ROM and on the web. According to Aminet, as of 3 September 2022, it has 83930 packages online.

== History ==
The idea for a Amiga-related software-archive was put into practice in 1991, when Swiss computer-science students of ICU – the informatics club of the University of Zurich in Canton of Zurich, Switzerland – started to use an Amiga 3000UX they previously got donated by the Switzerland-division of Commodore Int'l., and consequently put it to use to host a FTP-archive at amiga.physik.unizh.ch.

From the start of amiga.physik and its main-purpose of offering online many packages for AmigaOS itself (which the students collected amongst themselves), the FTP-server also acted additionally as the Amiga-UNIX's free anonymous official ftp-site, at which about forty users logged in on each day. However, following the announcement, the FTP-fileserver got stressed quickly due to overuse and requests from other FTP-mirrors.

In January 1992, Swiss student Urban Müller was then tasked to take upon the administrator's job of the software-archive, that had been started with other students of ICU since. Soon the archive became mirrored worldwide and in 1995 started being distributed on monthly CD-ROMs. By using a single master site (then wuarchive.wustl.edu) for creating ftp scripts for each slave site, Aminet reduced to a bare minimum the effort to set up new mirror sites.

Aminet also early on illustrated practical use of metadata schema by software repositories. Reports of daily additions to this software archive were posted automatically to Usenet (de.comp.sys.amiga.archive), or could be requested as an email newsletter – Most of the programs on Aminet were public domain or shareware, but software companies made updates and demo versions of their programs available as well. Now Aminet is complemented by platform-specific sites archiving software for AmigaOS 4, AROS or MorphOS only and sorted by architectures and platforms of m68k for the Motorola MC68000-series equipped original Amiga-hardware, Amiga-hardware equipped with PowerPC-based CPU-accelerators cards (Turbo-Cards) or x86-based Amiga-environments (e.g. Amithlon).

Aminet was an early attempt to create a centralized public archive maintained by the users themselves, predated only by the Info-Mac archive. Aminet aimed to keep the community united and free to download new open source software, new program demo releases, patches and localization of Amiga programs (AmigaOS and its modern programs are free to be localized by any single user into any country language), pictures, audio and video files and even hints or complete solutions to various Amiga games.

Recognized among interesting FTP sites in early 1990s, Aminet was the largest public archive of software for any platform until around 1996. When the Internet explosion occurred from 1996 to 1999, Aminet rapidly fell behind the emerging massive PC archives.

During 2004 the main Aminet mirror suffered from a hard-disk crash and many people considered the whole project dead. Around the same time, Nicolas Mendoza was setting up a modernized interface that indexed Aminet and provided advanced search features and a modern interface to navigate the tree, called Amirepo. He also posted public suggestions on how to help improving Aminet by adding tags for architectures to help catalog the tree that now consisted of MorphOS, AmigaOS 4 and Amithlon files, in addition to the already existing m68k, PowerUP and WarpOS files. He also suggested on measures to add proper dependencies to complement and replace the existing Requires field. This also in a future goal of letting Aminet function as a repository for package management systems similar to Debian's APT/DPKG and Red Hats' RPM. He tried to contact individuals like Matthias Scheler and Urban Müller which was known to maintain Aminet, but to no avail.

At the end of 2004 Christoph Gutjahr made contact with Urban Müller and set up a team to continue the Aminet effort. Urban Müller provided a new main mirror site and the backlog of packages were added in. The Amirepo interface of Nicolas Mendoza was integrated and Aminet was officially up and running again in February 2005. During 2005 the uploads started getting going again and in November 2005 most of the ambiguous files and .readme files were sorted out, finally sanitizing the repository. The team has gradually made many changes.
