= Warp3D =

3D software API for AmigaOS

- Developer(s): Sam Jordan, Hans-Joerg Frieden, Thomas Frieden, Hans De Ruiter
- Stable release: 53.22 / May 22, 2013; 12 years ago
- Operating system: AmigaOS
- Type: API
- License: Closed source
- Website: http://www.warp-3d.com

Warp3D Nova
- Developer(s): Hans De Ruiter for A-EON Technology
- Stable release: 1.85 / June 13, 2021; 4 years ago
- Operating system: AmigaOS
- Type: API
- License: Closed source
- Website: http://www.warp-3d.com

Warp3D was a project founded by Haage & Partner in 1998 that aimed to provide a standard API that would enable programmers to access, and therefore use, 3D hardware on the Amiga.

Its design was similar to that of both the Picasso96 graphics card drivers and operated in a similar fashion to the 3dfx Glide API, which provided a uniform and standardised way for programmers to create software for the 3D graphics cards that were available at the time.

It was hoped that the creation of this API would not only encourage the development and release of more 3D graphics cards, but also move away from the situation where a new piece of hardware had been developed with no software available to run on it. If the particular piece of software used the Warp3D API (enabled through a shared library), any current or newly developed hardware would be able to be used. Hyperion Entertainment developers created OpenGL subset called MiniGL sitting on top of Warp3D to ease porting of games such as Heretic II.

At time of its release, Warp3D provided significant speed increase over software rendering. Years later however, newer 3D APIs (e.g. TinyGL in MorphOS) offered better performance on the same hardware.

In 2014, it was announced that Warp3D was now jointly owned by British company A-EON Technology Ltd. On April 1, 2015, A-EON Technology subsequently released Warp3D for RadeonHD (Southern Islands chipset).

In March 2016, A-EON Technology Ltd announced that they had developed the new Warp3D Nova featuring support for Shaders. Warp3D Nova was originally mentioned as planned complete rewrite and Shader-centric design in the AmigaOS 4.0 Feature List more than decade earlier. Development of the new release intentionally took some inspiration from this original Warp3D Nova plan. The pre-release version 1.15 was published on 1 May 2016 in the Enhancer Software package for AmigaOS 4. Apart from its name and being related to 3D graphics, Warp3D Nova has nothing in common with the original Warp3D.

Also in March 2016 A-EON Technology Ltd announced that Daniel Müßener / GoldenCode.eu had been hired to create an OpenGL ES 2 implementation on top of Warp3D Nova. The first public version 1.4 was released on 31 August 2016 as part of the Enhancer Software package version 1.1.

== Running Requirements ==
Warp3D requires the following in order to work properly

- An AmigaOS compatible system with CyberGraphX or Picasso96, containing:
  - At least a 68040 processor with FPU for AmigaOS versions predating 4.0
  - A PowerPC CPU for AmigaOS 4.0+
  - Optionally PowerPC supported on WarpOS
  - Any of these graphics cards:
    - CyberVision 3D
    - CyberVision PPC
    - BlizzardVision PPC
    - Any 3Dfx Voodoo card
    - ATI Radeon R100, R200
    - ATI RadeonHD Southern Islands graphics cards

It also requires 3D hardware to be present, and will not run with graphics cards that are 2D only, or AGA, ECS or OCS.

== Other implementations ==

Alain Thellier created open source clone called Wazp3D. MorphOS included a Warp3D implementation known as Goa3D Graphics Library developed by Nicolas Sallin.
