= Amiga music software =

This article deals with music software created for the Amiga line of computers and covers the AmigaOS operating system and its derivates AROS and MorphOS and is a split of main article Amiga software. See also related articles Amiga productivity software, Amiga programming languages, Amiga Internet and communications software and Amiga support and maintenance software for other information regarding software that run on Amiga.

== Noteworthy Amiga music software ==
Samplitude by SEK'D (Studio fuer Elektronische Klangerzeugung Dresden), Instant Music, DMCS (DeLuxe Music) 1 and 2, Music-X, TigerCub, Dr. T's KCS, Dr. T's Midi Recording Studio, Bars and Pipes (from Blue Ribbon Soundworks, a firm which was bought by Microsoft and is now part of its group. Bars and Pipes internal structure then inspired to create audio streaming data passing of DirectX libraries), Aegis Audio Master, Pro Sound Designer, Aegis Sonix, Audio Sculpture, Audition 4 from SunRize Industries, SuperJAM!, HD-Rec, Audio Evolution, RockBEAT drum machine and various MIDI sequencing programs by Gajits Music Software.

=== Audio Digitizers Software ===
Together with Dr. T's Midi Recording Studio, Pro Sound Designer, Sonix, SoundFX, Audition 4, HD-Rec, and Audio Evolution, there was also much Amiga software to pilot digitizers such as GVP DSS8 Plus 8bit audio sampler/digitizer for Amiga, Sunrize AD512 and AD516 professional 12 and 16-bit DSP sound cards for the Amiga that included Studio-16 as standard software, Soundstage professional 20-bit DSP expansion sound card for the Amiga, Aura 12-bit sound sampler which is connected to the PCMCIA port of Amiga 600 and Amiga 1200 models, and the Concierto 16-bit sound card optional module to be added to the Picasso IV graphic card, etcetera.

=== Sound design / SoftSynth ===
Synthia, FMSynth by Christian Stiens (inspired by Yamaha's FM-operating DX Series), Assampler, SoundFX (a.k.a. SFX), WaveTracer, S.A.M. Sample-Synthesizer and Gajits' CM-Panion and 4D Companion patch editors.

== Mod music file format ==
Starting from 1987 with the release of Soundtracker, trackers became a new type of music programs which spawned the mod (module) audio file standard. The Mod audio standard is considered the audio format that started it all in the world of computer music. After Soundtracker many clones (which often were reverse engineered and improved) appeared, including Noisetracker, Startrekker, Protracker. Also many derivatives appeared, including OctaMED and Oktalyzer.

In the period from 1985 to 1995 when Amiga audio (which was standard in Amiga computers) was of greater quality than other standard home computers, PC compatible systems began to be equipped with 8-bit audio cards inserted into 16-bit ISA bus slots. Soundtracker Module files were used on PC computers and were considered the only serious 8-bit audio standard for creating music. The worldwide usage of these programs led to the creation of the so-called MOD-scene which was considered part of the demoscene. Eventually the PC world evolved to 16-bit audio cards, and Mod files were slowly abandoned. Various Amiga and PC games (such as Worms) supported Mod as their internal standard for generating music and audio effects.

Some trackers can use both sampled sounds and can synthesize sounds. AHX and Hively Tracker are special trackers in that they can't use samples, but can synthesize the sound created by Commodore 64 computers.

Some modern Amiga trackers are DigiBooster Pro^{[1]} and Hively Tracker.

Development of popular Amiga tracker OctaMED SoundStudio was handed over to a third party several times^{[2]} but the first two parties failed to produce useful results. A third attempt at creating an update will be undertaken by the current developer of Bars 'n Pipes.

=== MOD filetype evolution ===
Initially trackers (and the mod format) were limited to 4 channel, 8-bit audio (due to restrictions of the built-in soundchip) and 15 (and later 31) sampled instruments. By using software mixing some trackers achieved 6, 7 or 8 channel sound at the cost of CPU time and audio quality. Modern trackers can handle 128+ channel, 16-bit audio quality and can often handle up to 256 instruments. Some even support software synthesizer plugins as instruments.

== Speech synthesis ==
Example of speech synthesis with the included Say utility in Workbench 1.3

The original Amiga was launched with speech synthesis software, developed by Softvoice, Inc. (see: Text2Speech System). This could be broken into three main components: narrator.device, which could enunciate phonemes expressed as ARPABET, translator.library which could translate English text to American English phonemes, and the SPEAK: handler, which any application including the command-line could redirect output to, to have it spoken. Reading SPEAK: as it is producing speech will return two numbers which are the size ratio of the width and height of a mouth producing the phoneme being spoken^{[3]}.

In the original 1.x releases, a Say program demo was included with AmigaBASIC programming examples. From the 2.05 release on, narrator.device and translator.library were no longer present in the operating system but could still be used if copied over from older disks.

The word processor ProWrite, since its version 3.2, was able to read an entire document using the speech synthesizer for the benefit of blind users.

== See also ==
- List of music software
