= Arex (disambiguation) =

AREX is a South Korean railway line that links Seoul with Gimpo Airport and Incheon International Airport.

Arex may also refer to:

- Arex (Star Trek character), a character from Star Trek: The Animated Series
- Administrative Records Experiment, a project designed to explore alternatives to the 2010 United States Census
- Arex, one of Marvel's Eternals (comics)

== See also ==
- ARexx, an implementation of the REXX language for Commodore Amiga computers
