= Mindspace =

Mindspace may refer to:

== Business ==
- Raheja Mindspace, a brand of commercial and industrial parks in India
- Mindspace, a flow chart software for Amiga

== Education ==
- Mindspace, a programme to encourage entrepreneurship at the National Technical University of Athens
- Mindspace, the library of the Millennia Institute
- Mindspace, a student magazine at Vivekanand Education Society's Institute of Technology

== Other uses ==
- Mindspace Model, a behavioural change design model established by the UK Cabinet Office
