= Instant Music =

Instant Music may refer to more than one thing:

- Instant Music (software), interactive music software by Electronic Arts
- "Instant Music", a song by The Pillows on their album, Runners High
