= APUS (computer) =

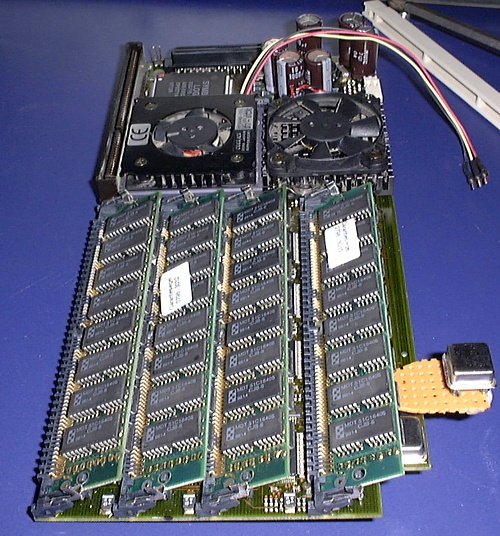
Phase5 CyberStormPPC/604e dual processor board for Amiga 4000 computers

APUS stands for "Amiga Power Up System", and describes a computer comprising an Amiga computer with a Phase5 PowerUP PowerPC accelerator board.
