= Haage & Partner =

German company

Haage & Partner Computer GmbH
- Type: Gesellschaft mit beschränkter Haftung
- Industry: Software industry, Development, Publishing, Distribution
- Founded: October 1995; 30 years ago in Glashütten (Taunus), Germany
- Founder: Jürgen Haage, Markus Nerding and Jochen Becher
- Products: Software
- Website: (1995–4.2022): www.haage-partner.de/en; (1997–now): www.haage-partner.com

Haage & Partner was a German company established in 1995. The company distributes software products where they usually are the exclusive distributor. Products are aimed at Microsoft Windows and Mac OS, and has been aimed at AmigaOS in the past. The primary destination countries are Germany, Austria, and Switzerland..

Other areas include translations into German of software and manuals. In some cases, complete packaging and organization. Media handling, advertising, presentation at fairs, German and English customer support, reseller support and print- and internet-related media production.

After the demise of Commodore International in 1994, the later owners of the Amiga trademark granted a license to the German company Haage & Partner to release updates to the Amiga's operating system, two of which have been produced as of 2011.

A former big product is "StormC", an integrated development environment which includes project management, compiler, debugger, linker, run-time-system and class library. This development system was available for both the Motorola 68000 family and PowerPC processors under the AmigaOS.

Another product for the Amiga platform is the WarpOS which is a multi-tasking kernel for the PowerPC architecture developed by Haage & Partner in the late 1990s and early 2000s. It ran on PowerUP accelerator boards developed by Phase5 which contained both a Motorola 68000 family CPU and a PowerPC CPU with shared address space.

On 1 August 2025, the company was officially deleted from the german commercial register.
