= Phase5 =

1992–2000 German Amiga hardware manufacturer

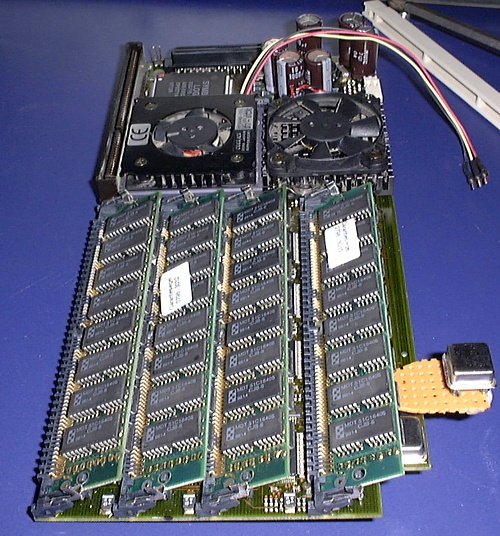
CyberStorm PPC604e board

Phase5 Digital Products is a defunct German computer hardware manufacturer that developed third-party hardware primarily for the Amiga platform. Their most popular products included CPU upgrade boards, SCSI controllers and graphics cards.

== Notable products ==
Like other third-party Amiga developers, Phase5 developed a range of CPU boards utilizing Motorola 68000 family processors, which powered Amiga systems at the time. Such boards also typically featured onboard RAM controllers with access to faster and greater capacity memory.

Notably, Phase5 were unique amongst Amiga developers in offering the Blizzard PPC and CyberStorm PPC products. These boards had a unique dual-CPU design utilizing both a Motorola 68k processor and a higher performance PowerPC processor. They operated in a novel fashion where both CPUs could execute concurrently while sharing the system address space. This architecture was enforced by the fact that AmigaOS was still 68k-based at the time and the required emulation software had not yet been developed to run natively on the PowerPC architecture. This design suffered from the need to flush CPU caches following context switches between 68k and PowerPC code. From a software development standpoint, this made mixing code ad hoc and often impractical. Minimizing such context switches required a large amount of effort and planning, making adoption of mixed binaries somewhat unpopular.

Phase5 developed a PowerPC kernel called PowerUP which ran alongside the 68k-based AmigaOS. Effectively, a programmer could then utilize the PowerPC CPU as a coprocessor. German company Haage & Partner developed a competing multi-tasking kernel called WarpOS for the Phase5 PowerPC boards which operated in a similar manner, but was not code-compatible with PowerUP.

The most common current reference to Phase5 is in the Linux port to APUS computer systems. Phase5 PowerPC boards are also able to run AmigaOS 4 and MorphOS.

== Corporate history ==
Phase5 was founded in 1992 as subsidiary company of AS&S (Advanced Systems & Software) by Wolf Dietrich and Gerald Carda, which were the owners of AS&S. Phase5 focused on the development of general Amiga hardware, but mainly CPU boards, SCSI controllers and graphics cards.

The company Phase5 Elektronikfertigungs GmbH (hardware manufacturing) was founded in 1996 as a subsidiary, which produced all of the Phase5 expansions from that time on.

Following the initial PowerPC boards plans were announced on 22 July 1999 for new PowerPC boards based on the G3. These were to be developed with QNX Software Systems with the intention of building an alternative to the official Amiga solution of the time, to be known as AMIRAGE K2. These products were never released.

On 9 February 2000 the company filed for insolvency and on 27 April 2000 the company was liquidated. DCE bought licenses before liquidation and produced some of the Phase5 hardware products under its own name. The A\Box, a concept for a complete computer scheduled for 1997 and based on custom chip technology, was planned but never released.

Much of Phase5's skill and experience was retained in a new company, bPlan GmbH, which in partnership with Genesi produced the Pegasos, a final realisation of several attempts to build an alternative Amiga system.
