= Cubic IDE =

AmigaOS IDE

- Cubic IDE under AmigaOS3
- Developer(s): Dietmar Eilert
- Initial release: (GoldED)1993; 32 years ago
- Stable release: 1.10 / December 7, 2009; 15 years ago
- Operating system: AmigaOS3, MorphOS
- Type: Integrated Development Environment, Text editor
- License: Proprietary
- Website: www.softwareandcircuits.com/division/amiga/products/cubic/

Cubic IDE is a proprietary, modular integrated development environment (IDE) for AmigaOS versions 3.5 and 3.9 and MorphOS. Its central editor is GoldED 8, which supports file type centric configuration.

== Requirements ==
Cubic IDE requires a 68k CPU, 4 to 8 MB of RAM for runtime and around 64 MB of RAM when compiling larger projects, and 4 MB to 650 MB of free hard drive space. A minimum resolution of 800x600 pixels is also required. No official support is given for operating systems newer than AmigaOS 3.9 and MorphOS 1.4, as the developer does not have a system running versions newer than these to test it on.

== Features ==
The IDE includes features such as syntax highlighting for several programming languages, folding, a symbol browser, a project explorer, an installation assistant (to create installations), support for creating Rexx macros and autodoc documentation, makefile generation, dialogs to set compiler options, automatic completion of OS symbols and clickable compiler output (jump to error). Compiler integration is available for popular C/C++ compilers for the supported platforms: GCC, vbcc, SAS/C and StormC3. Several compilers for AmigaOS 3, AmigaOS 4, PowerUP, WarpOS and MorphOS are included and integrated into the development environment.

All aspects of the IDE are configurable.
