= AmigaTeX =

- $\mathrm{AmigaT\!_{\displaystyle E} \! X}$
- Original author: Tomas Rokicki
- Developer: Radical Eye Software
- Stable release: 3.1h / 1987; 39 years ago
- Written in: C
- Operating system: AmigaDOS
- Type: Typesetting
- License: Proprietary
- Website: ~~www.radicaleye.com~~

The computer program AmigaTeX is a port of Knuth's typesetting program TeX, which was originally written in WEB. To create AmigaTeX, that source was translated to C by Tomas Rokicki. This manual translation was necessary because of the lack of a suitable Pascal compiler for the Amiga computer. When development of AmigaTeX commenced, WEB depended on Pascal and Web2c was not yet an available alternative.

== Features ==
AmigaTeX has several features not available in standard TeX:

- LaTeX
- ARexx port for example in conjunction with CygnusEd
- Preview
- Interchange File Format graphics integration

== See also ==
- LuaTeX
- XeTeX
