= CDXL =

Commodore video file format

CDXL is motion video file format developed by Commodore in the late 1980s and early 1990s for the Amiga computer platform. It is notable for being one of the earliest formats created for motion video playback from CD-ROM.

== Background ==
In an era shortly after the introduction of CD-ROM drives and before low cost MPEG decoding hardware became available the CDXL format was created, primarily for the Commodore CDTV, to permit playback of video from CD-ROM. CDXL is tailored for the Amiga chipset and takes advantage of DMA transfers, thus achieving playback with a low CPU load. As a result, CDXL can only support weak video compression and therefore relatively low video resolutions and moderate frame rates.

CDXL is a simple streaming format, consisting of linear concatenated chunks (packets), each with an uncompressed frame and associated audio data. There is no overall file header, just a header per chunk. The frame rate is constant but not stored in the file, so it is necessary to set the playback speed in the player software manually. The CDXL format initially allowed playback of up to 24 frames per second with up to 4096 colors encoded in HAM-6. Audio support allows for 8-bit mono or stereo sound. With the advent of the Amiga CD32, the CDXL format has been extended to support AGA color modes (up to 262,144 on-screen colors from a 24-bit color palette) and higher display resolutions.

== Usage ==
A number of Amiga CD-ROM games and entertainment software uses CDXL for motion video.

CDXL is supported by AmigaOS through its datatype system, which allows playback of CDXL files on compatible systems.

== Performance ==
Playback performance can be thought of as impressive at the time of release given the CDTV's Motorola 68000 processor, OCS chipset and single-speed CD-ROM drive constraints. A single-speed (150 kB/s) CD-ROM drive permits resolutions equivalent to 160×100 with 4,096 colors at 12 frame/s with 11025 Hz 8-bit mono audio. At these settings audio and visual quality is perceived as considerably worse than VHS.

A CDXL stream at 300 kB/s (equivalent to 256×128 at 12 frame/s) allows approximately 36 minutes of video to fit on CD-ROM. In comparison, a Video CD encoded in MPEG-1 format allows approximately 72 minutes of 352×288 (PAL) 24-bit color video at 25 frame/s .

== See also ==
- ANIM
- Interchange File Format
