= Behavioral Description Language =

Behavioral Description Language (BDL) is a programming language based on ANSI C with extensions for hardware description, developed to describe hardware at levels ranging from the algorithm level to the functional level.

Although the term Behavioral Description Language is a generic term and can refer to multiple high-level description languages, NEC Corporation has developed a C-subset called BDL for High-Level Synthesis. This C-subset includes its own data types (called var-class), special constants for hardware design e.g. high impedance, timing descriptors and control statements.

As BDL is meant for Hardware synthesis, the complete ANSI-C syntax is not supported. The principal unsupported operations are: (i) Floating point data types (ii) Sizeof operator (iii) unions and (iv) Recursive functions.

BDL is sometimes also known as Cyber C because it is synthesized using NEC's High-Level Synthesis tool called CyberWorkBench .
