= Mirror site =

Replica of website components hosted elsewhere

Mirror sites or mirrors are replicas of other websites. The concept of mirroring applies to network services accessible through any protocol, such as HTTP or FTP. Such sites have different URLs than the original site, but host identical or near-identical content. Mirror sites are often located in a different geographic region than the original, or upstream site. The purpose of mirrors is to reduce network traffic, improve access speed, ensure availability of the original site for technical or political reasons, or provide a real-time backup of the original site. Mirror sites are particularly important in developing countries, where internet access may be slower or less reliable.

Mirror sites were heavily used on the early internet, when most users accessed through dialup and the Internet backbone had much lower bandwidth than today, making a geographically localized mirror network a worthwhile benefit. Download archives such as Info-Mac, Tucows and CPAN maintained worldwide networks mirroring their content accessible over HTTP or anonymous FTP. Some of these networks, such as Info-Mac or Tucows are no longer active or have removed their mirrored download sections, but some like CPAN or the Debian package mirrors are still active in 2023. Debian removed FTP access to its mirrors in 2017 because of declining use and the relative stagnation of the FTP protocol, mentioning FTP servers' lack of support for techniques such as caching and load balancing that are available to HTTP. Modern mirrors support HTTPS and IPv6 along with IPv4.

On occasion, some mirrors may choose not to replicate the entire contents of the upstream server because of technical constraints, or selecting only a subset relevant to their purpose, such as software written in a particular programming language, runnable on a single computer platform, or written by one author. These sites are called partial mirrors or secondary mirrors.

== Examples ==
Notable websites with mirrors include Project Gutenberg, KickassTorrents, The Pirate Bay, WikiLeaks, the website of the Environmental Protection Agency, and Wikipedia. Some notable partial mirrors include free and open-source software projects such as GNU, in particular Linux distributions CentOS, Debian, Fedora, and Ubuntu; such projects provide mirrors of the download sites (since those are expected to have high server load). Many open source application providers such as VideoLAN use mirrors to distribute VLC Media Player, and The Document Foundation uses mirrors to distribute LibreOffice.

It was once common for tech companies such as Microsoft, Hewlett-Packard or Apple to maintain a network of mirrors accessible over HTTP or anonymous FTP, hosting software updates, sample code and various freely-downloadable utilities. Much of these sites were shut down in the first decades of the 21st century, with Apple shutting down its FTP services in 2012 and Microsoft stopping updates in 2010. Today, the contents of a number of these mirror sites are archived at The FTP Site Boneyard. Occasionally, some people will use web scraping software to produce static dumps of existing sites, such as the BBC's Top Gear and RedFlagDeals.

== See also ==
- InterPlanetary File System – makes mirror sites redundant
- Content delivery network
- cURL
- Cyber resilience
- Dark web
- DDoS
- Downtime
- HTTrack
- IRC network
- Mesh networking
- Peer-to-peer
- Replication (computing)
- Web archiving
- Website monitoring
- Wget
- Wikipedia:Mirrors and forks
