= Visual Nature Studio =

3D visualization program for Microsoft Windows

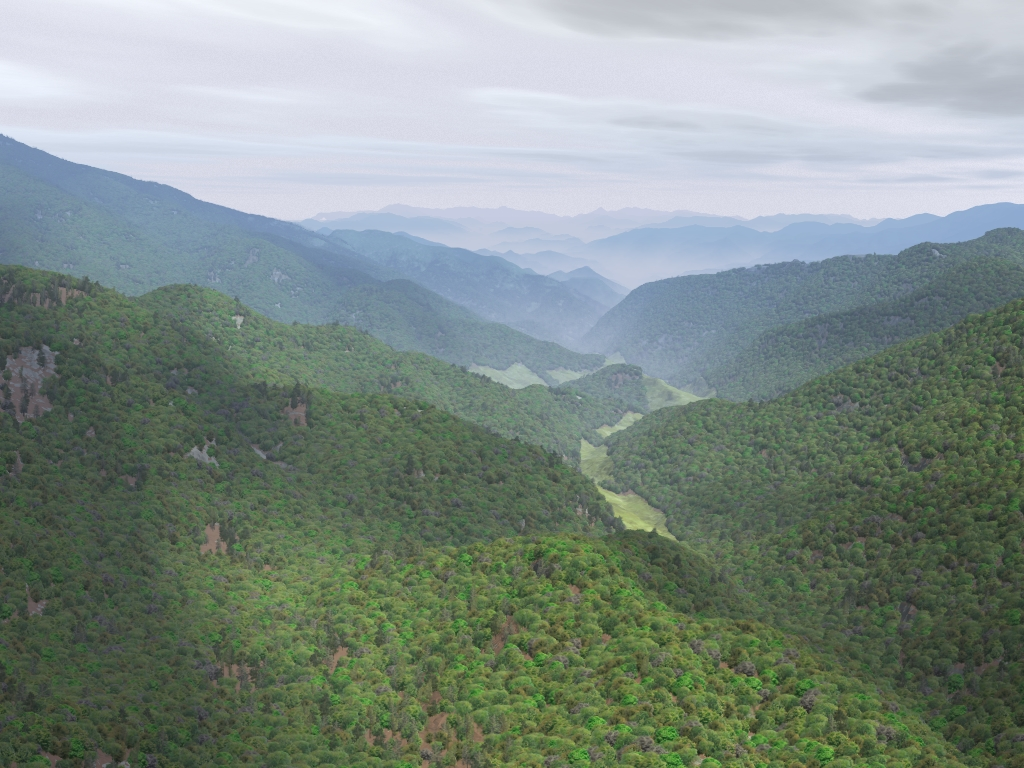
- Blue Ridge Pastures, Photorealistic View
- Original authors: 3D Nature, LLC
- Developers: Gary R. Huber, Chris 'Xenon' Hanson
- Release: Sept 7, 2001
- Stable release: 3.10 / Feb 23, 2015
- Operating system: Microsoft Windows
- Platform: PC
- Available in: English
- Type: 3D Visualization Software
- License: Dual licensed: Proprietary, OSGPL
- Website: http://3dnature.com

Visual Nature Studio is a 3D visualization program for Microsoft Windows, developed as an enhanced version of 3D Nature's "World Construction Set" software. The program produces photorealistic still images or animations of fictional or real landscapes by using digital elevation model (DEM) and geographic information system (GIS) data as input.

In late 2015, Visual Nature Studio was acquired along with all of 3D Nature's other assets by AlphaPixel LLC, another company founded by 3D Nature co-founder Chris 'Xenon' Hanson. AlphaPixel continues to sell and support Visual Nature Studio commercially under the 3D Nature brand but has also released the source code under the OSGPL (a variant of the LGPL) to ensure the software cannot be lost in the future and protect the investment of its users.
