= Imagine (3D modeling software) =

3D modeling and ray tracing program

- An animation of three spinning globes created with Imagine on an Amiga 4000
- Developer: Impulse
- Release: 1990
- Stable release: 5.19 / 2006
- Operating system: AmigaOS, MS-DOS, Microsoft Windows
- Predecessor: TurboSilver
- Type: 3D computer graphics

Imagine was the name of a cutting-edge 3D modeling and ray tracing program, originally for the Amiga computer and later also for MS-DOS and Microsoft Windows.

It was created by Impulse, Inc. It used the .iob extension for its objects. Imagine was a derivative of the software TurboSilver, which was also for the Amiga and written by Impulse.

CAD-Technologies continued the distribution of the Amiga version. Starting with version 5.1, new updates were available for free for current customers as part of the Amiga Constant Upgrade Program (ACUP) up until presumed Imagine 6.0 release.

== Versions ==
=== Amiga ===
- 1990 - Imagine
- 1992 - Imagine 2.0
- 1993 - Imagine 2.9
- 1994 - Imagine 3.0
- 1995 - Imagine 3.1
- 1995 - Imagine 3.2
- 1995 - Imagine 3.3
- 1995 - Imagine 4.0
- 1996 - Imagine 5.0
- 1998 - Imagine 5.1 and 5.1a (first ACUP release)
- 1998 - Imagine 5.13
- 2000 - Imagine 5.17
- 2006 - Imagine 5.19 (last public release)

=== MS-DOS ===
- 1993 - Imagine 2.0
- 1994 - Imagine 3.0
- 1995 - Imagine 4.0

=== Windows ===
- 1996 - Imagine 1.0
- 1997 - Imagine 1.3.4 (first CUP release)
- 1999 - Imagine 1.9
- 1999 - Imagine 2.0
- 1999 - Imagine 2.1.2
- 2000 - Imagine 2.1.3
- 2000 - Imagine 2.1.4 (no bones)
- 2002 - Imagine 2.1.5
- 2002 - Imagine 2.1.6 (additional effects (*.ifx files))
- 2002 - Imagine 2.1.7
- 2002 - Imagine 2.1.8 (additional effect (FireRing.ifx file))
- 2004 - Imagine 2.1.9 (last public release, added Volumetric)

== See also ==
- Sculpt 3D
