= Amiga Unix =

Amiga UNIX
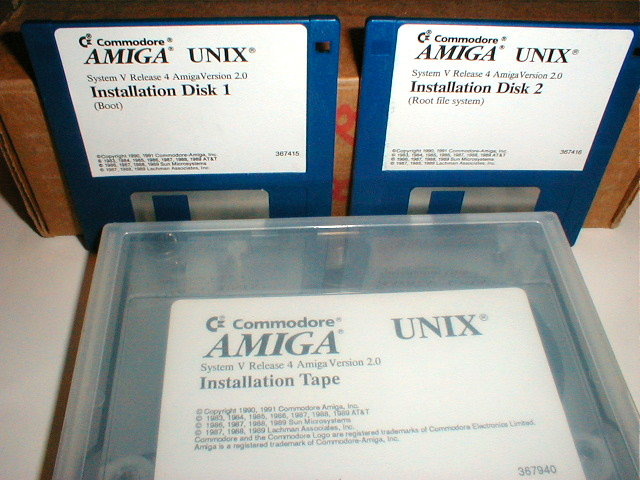
- Amiga Unix installation disks and tape
- Developer: Commodore-Amiga, Inc.
- OS family: Unix (SVR4)
- Working state: Historic
- Source model: primarily closed source
- Initial release: 1991; 35 years ago
- Latest release: 2.1 / 1992
- Supported platforms: Motorola 68030
- Kernel type: Monolithic
- License: Proprietary

Amiga Unix (informally known as Amix) is a discontinued full port of AT&T Unix System V Release 4 operating system developed by Commodore-Amiga, Inc. in 1990 for the Amiga computer family as an alternative to AmigaOS, which shipped by default.

== Overview ==
Bundled with the Amiga 3000UX, Commodore's Unix was one of the first ports of SVR4 to the 68k architecture, and this level of compliance was emphasised in marketing materials such as the company's "Born To Run UNIX SVR4" brochure. The Amiga 3000UX provided the OPEN LOOK graphical environment, with the machine reportedly featuring on the Sun Microsystems and Unix International stands at the 1991 Uniforum show, ostensibly as a consequence of Commodore's adoption of these exhibitors' technologies. An earlier Amiga-based graphical Unix system had reportedly featured on the AT&T booth at the Uniforum Fall '89 show.

Previewed at CeBIT in early 1988, the Amiga 2500UX was described as a Motorola 68020-based system that could be booted to Unix System V Release 3 (SVR3) or AmigaDOS, supporting an X Window System interface, as well as a "very fast and more flexible" proprietary windowing system that was also to be offered. Graphics acceleration using the Amiga chipset was promised, along with an upgrade kit consisting of an expansion board featuring the 68020 and a memory management unit for existing users to upgrade to the Unix system. September 1988 availability was announced for various European business and education markets, with a broader workstation market introduction in the US coming later. Shortly afterwards, at COMDEX Spring 1988, Commodore demonstrated its proprietary windowing system on an Amiga 2000 system running Unix, also showing off a 68030 upgrade board.

The Amiga 2500UX was more comprehensively described in COMDEX Fall 1988 show coverage as a 14.3 MHz Motorola 68020-based system with 80 MB hard drive and 150 MB tape system, fitted with 5 MB of RAM and featuring the Motorola 68851 memory management unit and Motorola 68881 floating-point unit (FPU). The "full implementation" of Unix System V was to be offered with the machine. A premature report had emerged of a version of Unix running on the Amiga 2000 at a separate October 1988 event, due to an X Window System implementation for AmigaDOS having been mistaken for a graphical Unix system. As of early 1989, Amiga Unix or AMIX was a SVR3.1 implementation on the Amiga 2500UX, reported as featuring a "proprietary windowing system" that was "specifically designed for speed and convenience". Developers had already reportedly received beta versions of the AMIX system, and system pricing was estimated at around $5,000.

Commodore described the Amiga 2500UX with the same 68020-based specifications at the CeBIT show in early 1989, also indicating a £1,700 price for the upgrade kit to bring the Amiga 2000 up to the capabilities of the 2500UX. In a May 1989 show in Toronto, Commodore had adjusted the specification of the 2500UX, making it a 68030-based machine running SVR3.3 and the "Amix Windows multi-tasking user interface", even suggesting a price of CA$8,500. By the end of 1989, the purpose of the 2500UX had become more apparent as a development machine, with Commodore UK suggesting that the eventual Unix product would be a 68030-based Amiga 3000 system running SVR4, available during 1990.

As the release of the Amiga 3000UX approached, the hardware requirements for Amiga 2000 systems running Unix were refined further, demanding an accelerator card such as the A2630, providing a 68030 CPU and 68882 FPU, bringing them into line with the A2500/30 variant of the Amiga 2500. More than 100 MB of hard drive storage and a tape drive for installing the operating system were required.

By the end of 1990, several months after the launch of the Amiga 3000, Commodore indicated plans to launch the 3000UX at the Uniforum show in January 1991, reportedly needing to finish off its SVR4 implementation and to attract software vendors to its platform. Finally, at Uniforum, two Amiga 3000UX configurations were unveiled, broadly confirming earlier reports. A reported 1,000 units had already been "shipped to beta-test sites" ahead of wider availability.

== Features ==
Amiga Unix supported the concept of "virtual screens", employing a combination of Alt and a function key to select each screen. However, unlike traditional virtual consoles, these virtual screens were capable of running graphical programs including distinct OPEN LOOK graphical sessions.

Unlike typical commercial Unix distributions of the time, Amiga Unix included the source code to the vendor-specific enhancements and platform-dependent device drivers (essentially any part not owned by AT&T), allowing users to study or enhance those parts of the system. However this source code was subject to the same license terms as the binary part of the system, which is not free software. Amiga Unix also incorporated and depended upon many open source components, such as the GNU C Compiler and X Window System, and included their source code.

== Reception ==
Although the Amiga 3000UX has a "responsive" experience, performance in the graphical environment was nevertheless described as being "on par with a slow 386 machine running SCO Open Desktop". Another evaluation of version 1.1 of the operating system described the X Window System performance as being "monochrome and slow as molasses", with an improved version 2.0 providing color support in conjunction with the A2410 graphics board. This board was launched later in 1991, offering a 1024 x 1024 resolution with 8-bit color, having been first announced in late 1988 as a collaboration with the University of Lowell. The card, based on the TMS34010, had previously been demonstrated at the Uniforum Fall '89 show.

The Amiga 3000UX's base price of $4,998 (equivalent to $12,000 in 2025), rising to a reported $7,713 with graphics board (priced separately at around $1,000) and colour monitor, was not especially attractive compared to other Unix workstations at the time. By the end of 1989, around a year before availability of the Amiga 3000UX, vendors such as Hewlett-Packard and Sun had already launched 68030-based models aimed at the low-end of the market. HP had started 1989 by launching its low-cost HP 9000 Model 340 workstation range with prices starting from $5,495. Later in the year, the Apollo DN2500, positioned as an entry-level workstation with monochrome display by HP's Apollo division, cost only $3,990 for a diskless model or $5,490 with hard disk, eliminating the distinction between workstations and personal computers in pricing terms. The Sun 3/80 cost $5,990 for a comparable entry-level product.

RISC-based competitors offering superior performance were also already available at similar price levels as competition increased, such as the DECstation 2100 (reduced to $5,950), and numerous SPARC workstations were anticipated at this $5,000 price point during 1990. Sun's SPARCstation 1, introduced alongside the 3/80, had cost $8,995 for the diskless version in 1989. By the end of 1991, models such as the Sun SPARCstation IPC would cost around $6,695 for a model similarly specified to a complete A3000UX bundle in terms of memory, disk capacity and display, yet offer considerably better performance. The anticipated low-cost SPARC clones, such as Tatung's CompStation, remained stubbornly above $5,000 for the base system, but comparably specified system packages became available during 1991 for less than $6,000 amid intensifying competition from Sun, itself under considerable competitive pressure, and Silicon Graphics.

Commodore's product marketing manager indicated that the machine was intended to compete with machines from NeXT and Apple's A/UX, conceding, "We really don't see ourselves as being competitive with Sun." Advertising for the system focused on Apple and NeXT as competitors, emphasising its adoption of System V, OPEN LOOK and X Window System technologies. However, within a year of its launch, the Amiga 3000UX's 68030 was already considered "one whole generation behind" the 68040-based NeXTstation, priced from $4,995 with greyscale display, $7,995 with colour display.

Apple had introduced models based on the 25 MHz 68040 in late 1991, following up with the 33 MHz Macintosh Quadra 950 in 1992, priced from $7,199 for a floppy-only model and $8,499 with hard disk. A/UX had itself been regarded as a "good value" product, but system performance was regarded as only "acceptable but not great" even on the top-end Quadra 950, and it was noted that the price-performance ratio of such A/UX systems fell short of models from Sun, HP, IBM and others. Later entry-level workstations from established vendors upheld their aggressive pricing while increasing the performance gap over such 68040-based systems. For example, the Personal DECstation 5000 Model 20 provided a newer CPU and was priced from only $3,995 for a diskless configuration, with the faster Model 25 being available in a colour display configuration with hard disk for $8,495.

Differences in the nature of Commodore's channels between the US and European markets also prevented Commodore from exploiting opportunities to sell Amiga Unix systems. Attempts had been made to target "untapped professional markets" and position the Amiga as a more serious multimedia-capable machine, also satisfying the "corporate checklist" by offering Unix and networking capabilities. In the US market, specialist dealers played an important role in the sales effort and were considered more able to support sophisticated products based on Unix. However, European sales of the Amiga range were largely driven by high street retailers targeting a computer gaming demographic, and a shift in emphasis requiring the introduction of a capable sales and support infrastructure was perceived as being more costly than the potential earnings generated through Unix product sales. Moreover, an increasingly competitive European Unix market led to doubts that such sales would materialise, putting the European availability of Amiga Unix into question.

In an attempt to respond to the competitive situation, Commodore released version 2.1 of Amiga Unix in early 1992, reducing the price of an Amiga 3000UX system bundle featuring 9 MB of RAM, 200 MB hard drive, A2410 high-resolution graphics card, Ethernet card, and colour monitor (or SCSI tape drive) for a limited period to $4,998, compared to a combined retail price of $8,495. By this time, HP had already introduced 68040-based workstations at the low end of the market, such as the HP Apollo 9000 Model 425e, available from $5,490 for an 8 MB, diskless model with 19-inch greyscale monitor. In early 1992, it was reported that Commodore had appointed solution provider Applied Systems Group as the sole UK reseller of Amiga Unix. Commodore maintained claims of the platform outperforming "traditional vendors in its price bracket", also claiming to have converted numerous existing users of "Sun 4, 486 and 68000-based workstations" to the platform.

Unlike Apple's A/UX compatibility layer for System 7 applications, Amiga Unix contains no compatibility layer for AmigaOS applications. Prior to the system's release, Commodore had merely indicated that the company had been "discussing" such application support. Commodore's UK marketing manager stated that user interface guidelines would be introduced to ensure consistency between traditional Amiga and Amiga Unix applications, with Amiga Unix offering a "friendly Mac-like environment". With few native applications available to take advantage of the Amiga's significant multimedia capabilities, it failed to find a niche in the competitive Unix workstation market of the early 1990s beyond certain targeted deployments. For instance, computer science students at Virginia Tech were obliged to purchase the Amiga 3000UX to pursue their studies, with students offered a base model providing 4 MB of RAM, a 100 MB hard disk, and colour monitor for around $4,000.

Like many other proprietary Unix variants with small market shares, Amiga Unix was discontinued when its vendor, Commodore, went out of business. Unix-like operating systems such as Minix, NetBSD, and Linux are available for the Amiga platform.

== Speculation ==
Unsubstantiated rumours of the adoption of the Amiga 3000UX as a product by Sun Microsystems have been presented in various online venues, despite Sun already fielding a comprehensive workstation range and pursuing a technological direction that was leading the company away from Motorola's 68000 family and towards Sun's favoured SPARC architecture, describing demand for 68000 family systems as "very, very low". One instance of coverage of such rumours that appeared in contemporary print media characterised such rumours as "an amusing tidbit" with the author presciently regarding the rumoured development as unlikely.

Other rumours supposedly persisted towards the beginning of 1990 that Hewlett-Packard had been "negotiating to buy Commodore", only to pull out, eliciting later claims of HP workstations with "suspiciously Amiga-like specifications". Such commentary was evidently oblivious to HP's existing extensive workstation ranges, including Motorola-based systems, and its 1989 acquisition of Apollo Computer in pursuit of workstation market share and application support. Indeed, this acquisition led to a degree of duplication in HP's Motorola-based product ranges in need of careful resolution, but brought with it numerous Apollo developers and customers. Such considerations and benefits would have been largely absent in any hypothetical Commodore acquisition.

== See also ==
- Atari TT030, Unix workstation from Atari
