= Excellence (software) =

excellence! manual cover

Excellence was a word processor for the Amiga computer, created by Micro-Systems Software as a follow-up to their earlier Scribble! word processor. The primary author was Steve Pagliarulo. It was one of the first WYSIWYG word processors for the Amiga.

After the initial release there were two major updates, the last being version 3.0, released in 1993. This was the final software program released by Micro-Systems.
