= The Blue Ribbon SoundWorks =

Defunct American software company

- Type: Private
- Founded: 1988; 38 years ago in the United States
- Founder: Melissa Jordan Grey; Todor Fay
- Defunct: 1995
- Fate: Acquired by Microsoft

The Blue Ribbon SoundWorks was a software company in the United States. The company produced several digital audio products for the Amiga, including Bars & Pipes, a sequencer described by Sound on Sound as "the ultimate in Amiga sequencing", and SuperJAM!, a music composition tool. Blue Ribbon also produced the One Stop Music Shop, a hardware MIDI interface and synthesizer based on the E-mu Proteus. Other early products included Who! What! When! Where!, a personal information manager. It was founded by Melissa Jordan Grey and Todor Fay, who went on to found NewBlue, a video technology company.

Blue Ribbon was acquired by Microsoft in 1995, and Microsoft subsequently merged Blue Ribbon's technology with DirectSound. After the acquisition, Microsoft made Blue Ribbon's Amiga products available for free download on CompuServe while discontinuing official support.
