= Amiga 3000UX =

Model of the Amiga computer family

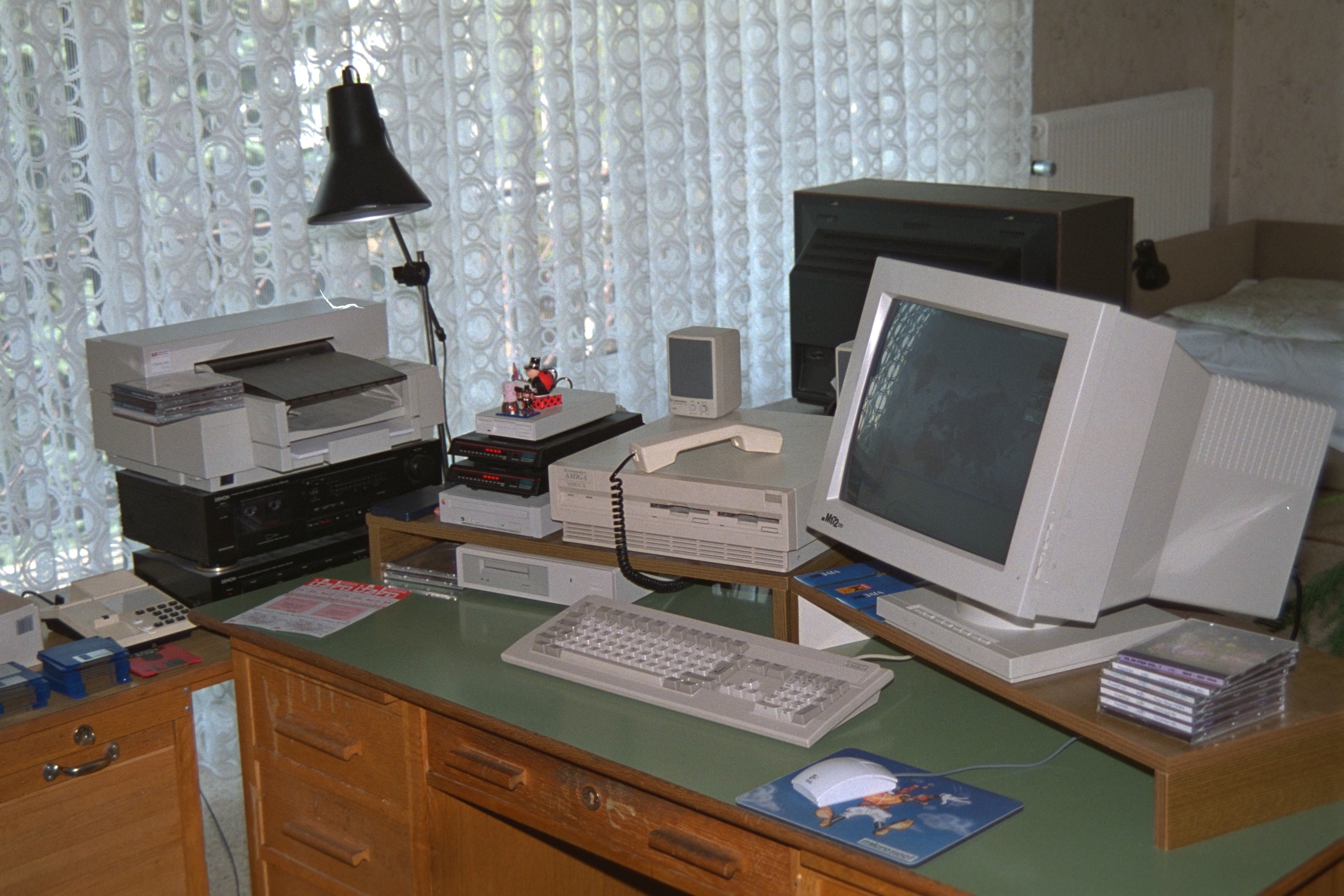
- Type: Workstation
- Released: 1990; 36 years ago
- Discontinued: 1992
- Media: Magnetic tape data storage
- Operating system: Amiga UNIX System V Release 4
- CPU: Motorola 68030 @ 25 MHz
- Memory: 2 MB
- Graphics: Texas Instruments Graphics Architecture
- Connectivity: Ethernet

The Amiga 3000UX is a model of the Amiga computer family that was released with Amiga Unix, a full port of AT&T Unix System V Release 4 (SVR4), installed along with AmigaOS. The system is otherwise equivalent to the standard A3000, once a right-click initiates a boot to Kickstart (Amiga's kernel).

Sun Microsystems and Unix International featured the Amiga 3000UX on their stands at the 1991 Uniforum event, ostensibly to promote Commodore's adoption of those exhibitors' technologies, specifically OPEN LOOK and SVR4. This may have led to unsubstantiated rumours about Sun potentially incorporating the model into its workstation range, sustained by persistent community perceptions of Commodore's managerial incompetence.

It is possible that Commodore (or a third party) repurposed A3000UX machines for standard AmigaOS, as some standard A3000 models have been found with labeling suggesting they were originally to be sold as A3000UX machines.

== See also ==
- List of Amiga models and variants
