= Info-Mac =

Website covering Apple Inc. products

- Screenshot of Info-Mac as of 2011-03-11
- Website type: Forum, news aggregator, and file hosting service for Macintosh and iOS.
- Available in: English
- Owner: Dan Palka
- Creator: Ed Pattermann
- Website: info-mac.org
- Commercial: Yes
- Registration: Optional
- Launched: 1984
- Current status: Open

Info-Mac is an online community, news aggregator and shareware file hosting service covering Apple Inc. products, including the iPhone, iPod and especially the Macintosh. Established in 1984 as an electronic mailing list, Info-Mac is notable as being the first online community for Apple's then-new Macintosh computer. Info-Mac was the dominant Internet resource for Mac OS software and community-based support throughout the 1980s and early 1990s.

== Original format ==
Info-Mac consisted of two distinct services: the Info-Mac Archive, a user-submitted collection of nearly all contemporary freeware and shareware available for the Macintosh, and the Info-Mac Digest, an electronic mailing list open to public participation. Both the Info-Mac Archive and Info-Mac Digest were operated by volunteers.

=== Info-Mac Digest ===
The Info-Mac Digest was published daily via Stanford University servers, and was itself archived on the Info-Mac Archive. At its height, the Info-Mac Digest was read daily by several thousand people, and was mirrored in the Usenet group comp.sys.mac.digest.

The Info-Mac Digest was published in "volumes" that covered the period of one calendar year, with some exceptions.

=== Info-Mac Archive ===
The Info-Mac Archive was the centralized collection of Macintosh software with over 100 mirror sites located around the world. At the time, disk space on a server was cost-prohibitive and hard to come by. Free public archives such as Info-Mac were often the only means for shareware authors to deliver their product over the Internet. Some early commercial software download sites, like CNET's Shareware.com, were originally mirrors of the Info-Mac Archive.

Due to the low-bandwidth connections accessible by early Internet users, which made downloading large files an onerous task, Info-Mac partnered with Pacific HiTech to periodically publish CD-ROMs containing selected shareware and freeware from the archive. These CDs were sold through Mac-related magazines and publications. Licensing issues required software authors to specifically allow their contributions to be included on the CD-ROM through a statement in the file's abstract. The CDs allowed wider distribution to users who did not have network access or could not spare the long download times associated with software applications. As the software was encoded in BinHex or MacBinary format it could be stored on non-Mac file systems such as a BBS or FTP server. Starting with the Info-Mac VI CD-ROM, the discs included the utility "Spelunker" which allowed users to search the archive in a user-friendly manner. Starting with the Info-Mac VIII CD-ROM, the package included two discs to offer twice the shareware and freeware.

== Decline and 2007 relaunch ==
The popularity of Info-Mac services in their original format waned in the late 1990s. As the growing popularity of the World Wide Web and web hosting services allowed software authors to distribute their own software, and for users to communicate on online message boards, demand for Info-Mac's services grew beyond the capability of an all-volunteer staff to provide and maintain it at an acceptable level. Unable to maintain relevance on the rapidly evolving Internet, the Info-Mac Digest was discontinued in November 2002, while the Info-Mac Archive stopped accepting new file submissions in December 2005.

In December 2007, Info-Mac was redesigned and relaunched with a Web 2.0 interface, combining previous Info-Mac Digest and Info-Mac Archive content with a modernized forum-based community and news aggregator. Today, Info-Mac has expanded to cover all Apple product lines. A new, opt in Info-Mac Digest automatically generated from forum content is published daily. Info-Mac also distributes an iOS app called iForum on the App Store.
