= CygnusEd =

Computer text editing software, launched 1987

CygnusEd Professional
- Developers: Bruce Dawson, Olaf Barthel
- Initial release: 1987; 38 years ago
- Stable release: 5.60 / September 20, 2010; 15 years ago
- Operating system: AmigaOS, MorphOS
- Type: Text editor
- License: Closed source
- Website: www.cygnused.de/index-en.php

CygnusEd is a text editor for the AmigaOS and MorphOS. It was first developed in 1986-1987 by Bruce Dawson, Colin Fox and Steve LaRocque who were working for CygnusSoft Software. It was the first Amiga text editor with an undo/redo feature and one of the first Amiga programs that had an AREXX scripting port by which it was possible to integrate the editor with AREXX enabled C compilers and build a semi-integrated development environment. Many Amiga programmers grew up with CygnusEd and a considerable part of the Amiga software library was created with CygnusEd.

It remained popular even after Commodore's bankruptcy in 1994. In 1997 version 4 was developed by Olaf Barthel and was ported to MorphOS by Ralph Schmidt in 2000 and made available for users having the original CygnusED 4 CDROM. In 2007 version 5 was finished by Olaf Barthel again, which runs natively on AmigaOS 2 and AmigaOS 4.
