= Administrative Records Experiment =

United States Census project

The Administrative Records Experiment was a project designed to explore technical alternatives to the 2010 United States census.

== See ==
- Reengineering the 2010 Census: Risks and Challenges. Administrative Records Experiment in 2000 (AREX 2000): Household Level Analysis. Census 2000 Experiment Report. Washington, DC: U.S. Census Bureau.
