= Dr. T's Music Software =

American software company

Dr. T's Music Software, Inc., was a software company based in Massachusetts and founded in 1984 by Emile Tobenfeld. The company developed music software for the Atari ST, Commodore 64, Commodore 128, Amiga, IBM Personal Computer, and Macintosh. It operated until 1993.

== Products ==
=== Software ===
- Hitman - cue sheets
- X-oR (Amiga, Atari, Macintosh) - patch editor
- Tunesmith - composing
- Tiger Cub (Atari ST) - sequencer
- Tiger - sequencer
- Samplemaker - sample editor
- Realtime 1.2 - sequencer
- Music Mouse - composing
- Midi Recording Studio (Atari ST, Amiga) - sequencer
- M - composing
- Keys! - composing
- KCS - sequencer (Commodore 64/128, Amiga)
- KCS Omega - Keyboard Controlled Sequencer
- Tempo Master MPE
- Fingers - composing
- Copyist Professional (Amiga) - scoring
- Copyist Apprentice (Amiga/IBM PC) - scoring
- Prism (IBM PC) - MIDI sequencer
- Algorithmic Composer (Commodore 64/128) - algorithmic composition
- Echo Plus
- Convertifile Plus
- T-Basic (Atari) - BASIC programming

Patch editors for:

- Roland MT-32
- Roland D-110
- Oberheim Matrix 6/1000
- Lexicon PCM-70
- Korg M1
- Korg DS-8
- Korg DP3000
- Kawai K5
- Kawai K3
- Kawai K1
- FX-Pac-1
- Caged Artist - Roland D-50
- 4-op Deluxe
- ESQ-apade - Ensoniq ESQ-1/Ensoniq SQ-80
- E-mu Proteus/XR
- DX/TX Heaven
- Casio VZ Rider
- Casio CZ Rider
- VDS - Ensoniq Mirage

=== Hardware ===
- Model-A (Amiga 500/1000) - MIDI interface
- Model-I (IBM PC) - MIDI interface card
- Model-T (Commodore 64/128) - MIDI interface
- Phantom - MIDI interface/SMPTE synchroniser
