= Amiga E =

General-purpose programming language for the Amiga family of computers

- Paradigm: Multi-paradigm: functional, object-oriented, procedural
- Designed by: Wouter van Oortmerssen
- First appeared: September 29, 1993; 32 years ago
- Final release: v3.3a / October 27, 1997; 28 years ago
- Platform: Motorola 68000 series
- OS: AmigaOS
- License: freeware
- Filename extensions: .e
- Website: aminet.net/package/dev/e/amigae33a

Influenced by
- Ada, C++, Lisp

Amiga E is a programming language created by Wouter van Oortmerssen on the Amiga computer. The work on the language started in 1991 and was first released in 1993. The original incarnation of Amiga E was being developed until 1997, when the popularity of the Amiga platform dropped significantly after the bankruptcy of Amiga intellectual property owner Escom AG.

According to Wouter van Oortmerssen:

"It is a general-purpose programming language, and the Amiga implementation is specifically targeted at programming system applications. [...]"

In his own words:

"Amiga E was a tremendous success, it became one of the most popular programming languages on the Amiga."

== Overview ==
Amiga E combines features from several languages but follows the original C programming language most closely in terms of basic concepts. Amiga E's main benefits are fast compilation (allowing it to be used in place of a scripting language), very readable source code, flexible type system, powerful module system, exception handling (not C++ variant), and Object-oriented programming.

Amiga E was used to create the core of the popular Amiga graphics software Photogenics.

== "Hello, World!" example ==
A "Hello, World!" program in Amiga E looks like this:

PROC main()
    WriteF('Hello, World!')
ENDPROC

== History ==
1993: The first public release of Amiga E; the first release on Aminet was in September, although the programming language source codes were published on the Amiga E mailing list at least since May.

1997: The last version of Amiga E is released (3.3a).

1999: Unlimited compiler executable of Amiga E is released.

1999: Source code of the Amiga E compiler in m68k assembler is released under the GPL.

== Implementations and derivatives ==
=== Discontinued ===
==== Amiga E ====
The first compiler. It was written by Wouter van Oortmerssen in m68k assembler. It supports tools that are written in E. The compiler generates 68000 machine code directly.

- Platforms: AmigaOS and compatibles.
- Targets: Originally AmigaOS with 68000 CPU, but has modules that can handle 68060 architecture.
- Status: Stable, mature, discontinued, source available, freeware.

==== CreativE ====
It was created by Tomasz Wiszkowski. It is based on the GPL sources of Amiga E and adds many extensions to the compiler.

- Platforms: AmigaOS and compatibles.
- Targets: Like Amiga E, plus some limited support for the last generations of m68k CPUs.
- Status: Stable, mature, discontinued in 2001, source available, freeware.

==== PowerD ====
It was created by Martin Kuchinka, who cooperated with Tomasz Wiszkowski in the Amiga development group "The Blue Suns." It is derived from the Amiga E and CreativE languages but is incompatible with the former due to syntax changes.

- Platforms: AmigaOS and compatibles.
- Targets: AmigaOS 3.0 or newer; at least 68020 CPU+FPU or PowerPC (PPC); and 4MB of RAM.
- Status: Stable, mature, closed source, freeware. The project has been dormant since 2010.

==== YAEC ====
Written from scratch in Amiga E by Leif Salomonsson and published in 2001. It uses an external assembler and linker. The project was abandoned in favor of ECX.

- Platforms: AmigaOS and compatibles.
- Targets: AmigaOS 3.0 with 68020 CPU and FPU.
- Status: Obsolete, unfinished, discontinued, closed source, freeware.

==== ECX ====
A compiler and tools written from scratch by Leif Salomonsson in Amiga E, with internal functions developed in m68k and PPC assemblers. It can compile itself, supports multiple targets, and adds many extensions.

- Platforms: AmigaOS compatibles and derivatives.
- Targets: AmigaOS 3.0, AmigaOS 4, and MorphOS with m68k or PPC architecture.
- Status: Stable, mature, open source, freeware. The project has been dormant since 2013.

==== RE ====
RE was created by Marco Antoniazzi in PowerD. It is not fully compatible with the Amiga E.

- Platforms: AmigaOS and compatibles.
- Targets: AmigaOS 3.0 68020 CPU+FPU; PPC.
- Status: Stable, closed source, freeware. Dormant since 2008.

=== Under development ===
==== Portabl E ====
Created by Christopher Handley. It is a meta-compiler written from scratch in Amiga E. It can compile itself and supports multiple targets.

- Platforms: AmigaOS (m68k), AmigaOS 4 (PPC), AROS, MorphOS, Linux, and Windows,
- Targets: C++ and Amiga E. The Amiga E code is compatible with CreativE, and with proper settings, it can be compatible with the ECX compiler.
- Status: Stable, mature, under development, closed source, freeware.

==== E-VO ====
It is a derivative of the Amiga E compiler, written by Darren Coles. It expands upon the original language and incorporates features from the CreativE compiler.

- Platforms: AmigaOS and compatibles.
- Targets: Like Amiga E; AmigaOS with 68000 and 020+ CPU.
- Status: Stable, mature, under development, source available, freeware.
