= TurboSilver =

- Developer: Impulse
- Release: 1986
- Stable release: 3.0 / January 1988
- Operating system: AmigaOS
- Successor: Imagine
- Type: 3D computer graphics

TurboSilver was one of the original 3D raytracing software packages available for the Amiga and for personal computers in general.

It was first revealed by its creator Impulse at the October 1986 AmiEXPO. November 1987 saw the release of version 2.0. Version 3.0 was released in January 1988.

Impulse created a replacement for it, named Imagine in 1990.

== See also ==
- Sculpt 3D
