= Scala (company) =

Software company

- Type: Private
- Industry: Computer software
- Founded: 1987
- Headquarters: Varberg, Sweden, Varberg, Sweden, SE
- Key people: Sebastian Kryh (CEO)
- Products: Scala Enterprise
- Website: www.scala.com

Scala is a producer of multimedia software. It was founded in 1987 as a Norwegian company called Digital Visjon.

After ten years as a subsidiary of STRATACACHE, Scala’s core business and assets were acquired by Vertiseit, a company listed on Nasdaq First North Growth Market, effective June 1, 2026. Scala was integrated into Vertiseit’s subsidiary, DISE, a digital signage company acquired by Vertiseit in 2018.

VertiseIT announced on September 28, 2026 that Dise will become Scala.

It is currently headquartered in Varberg, Sweden, and has subsidiaries in the United States and other countries in Europe.

== History ==
In 1987, Jon Bøhmer founded the company "Digital Visjon" in Brumunddal, Norway to create multimedia software on the Commodore Amiga computer platform. In 1988, the company released its first product which was named InfoChannel 0.97L, which had hotels and cable TV companies as their first customers.

In 1990, they redesigned the program with a new graphical user interface. They renamed the company and the software "Scala" and released a number of multimedia applications. The company attracted investors, mainly from Norway and incorporated in the US in 1994 and is now based in the United States with their European headquarters located in the Netherlands.

The name "Scala" was given by Bøhmer and designer Bjørn Rybakken and represents the scales in colors, tones and the opera in Milan. The name inspired a live actor animation made by Bøhmer and Rybakken using an Amiga, a video camera and a frame-by-frame video digitizer. The animation, named Lo scalatore (Italian for 'The Climber'), featured a magic trick of Indian fakirs of a man climbing a ladder and disappearing in the air.

In 1994 Scala released Multimedia MM400 and InfoChannel 500.

Due to bankruptcies of Commodore and Escom in 1994 and 1996 respectively, Scala left the Amiga platform and started delivering the same applications under MS-DOS. Scala Multimedia MM100, Scala Multimedia Publisher and Scala InfoChannel 100 were released for the x86 platform. Scala Multimedia MM100 won Byte Magazine's "Best of Comdex" in 1996.

== Leadership ==
As of December 2013, the CEO of Scala is Tom Nix, who was formerly a regional vice president. Nix succeeded Gerard Bucas, who retired after nine years.

== Products ==
=== Scala Multimedia ===
The first versions for the Amiga computer were a video titler and slide show authoring system. Scala was bundled with typefaces, background images, and a selection of transition effects to be applied to them.

Succeeding versions of the program on the same platform added features such as animation playback, more effects ("Wipes") and the ability to interact with multimedia devices through a programming language called "Lingua" (Latin for "language").

With its move to Windows, Scala became more complex and gained the ability to support languages such as Python and Visual Basic.

=== Scala5 ===
In late 2008, Scala stopped calling their product line InfoChannel and went through a period of referring only to their "solutions". At the start of 2009, the product line was being called 'Scala5' and being referred to as such in all their press releases.

Scala5 has three main components: Scala Designer, an authoring program which is used to create dynamic content, Scala Content Manager, which is used to manage and distribute content, and Scala Player, which plays back the distributed content.

=== Scala Enterprise ===
Scala's latest suite of Digital signage software is referred to as Scala Enterprise. The solution, a software suite consisting of Scala Designer, Scala Player, and Scala Content Manager officially launched in mid- 2013. At launch, release version 10.0 featured HTML5 and Android player support, the usage of interactive features on mobile devices to engage with retail and corporate communications audiences, and social media integrations.

As of April 2018, the latest version of Scala Enterprise is version 11.05.
