= Sculpt 3D =

Raytrace application released in 1987 for Amiga computers

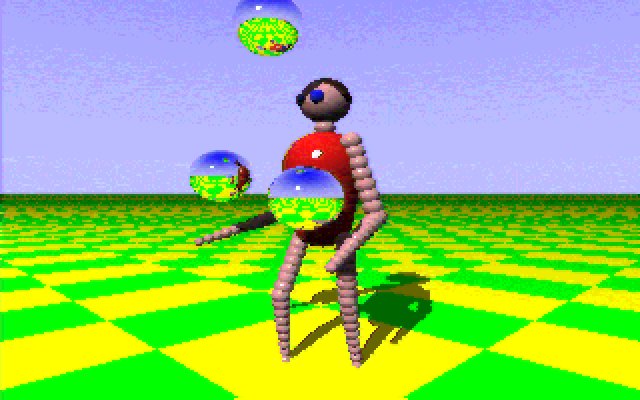
- Juggler (published 1987 on Fish Disk 47)
- Developer: Eric Graham
- Release: 1987
- Operating system: AmigaOS, Mac OS
- Successor: Sculpt 4D (Sculpt-Animate 4D)
- Type: 3D computer graphics

Sculpt 3D is a raytrace application released in 1987 for Amiga computers programmed by Eric Graham. Sculpt 3D was one of the first ray tracing applications released for the Amiga computers. It proved that raytracing could be done on home computers as well as on mainframes. Years later, the company Byte by Byte released a port for the Apple Macintosh.

== The Amiga Juggler ==
The first demo that showed the raytracing capabilities was an animation of a juggler juggling three chrome balls. Even though the juggler was constructed out of spheres, the balls' reflections and movement made it look realistic. The juggler demo was generated on an experimental version of Sculpt 3D. The animation, released in January 1986, generated so much interest that the full 3D application was programmed.

== Sculpt 4D ==
Sculpt 3D created still images, and a tool compiled an animation from these still images. Sculpt 4D (Sculpt-Animate 4D) added animation capabilities to Sculpt 3D. It allowed movement of objects by setting keyframes.

== See also ==
- TurboSilver
- Imagine
