= Instant Music (software) =

- Apple IIGS screenshot
- Developer(s): Electronic Arts
- Initial release: 1986
- Platform: Amiga, Apple IIGS, Commodore 64
- Type: Interactive music, music sequencer

Instant Music is interactive music software released by Electronic Arts in 1986. It was developed first for the Amiga, but then ported to the Apple IIGS and Commodore 64. Instant Music was created and developed by Robert Campbell. The prototype was created on the Commodore 64 and EA producer Stewart Bonn championed its inclusion in EA's product offerings for the then upcoming Amiga platform.

Instant Music allows the user to make variations on songs played by the software. The program comes with several songs of a few genres. As the software plays a song, the player, by moving the mouse up and down (or joystick with some versions), can make variations in the current tones. The software makes sure that any variations don't result in un-harmonic tunes.

== Reception ==
In December 1986, Bruce Webster's column in Byte magazine selected Instant Music as product of the month, calling it "an outstanding program." Webster praised Instant Music for turning the Amiga into "an intelligent electronic instrument" that allows "even an untalented hack" to create real music without much effort. Webster's only criticism was the key disk copy protection.

AmigaWorld gave Instant Music a 1986 Editor's Choice Award, calling it "the most fun you can have with your Amiga and your ears." AmigaWorld praised Instant Music's ability to let non-musicians create impressive music. AmigaWorld also awarded Instant Music two tongue-in-cheek awards: "The Roll Over Beethoven Award [...] For turning the complete idiot into a composer" and "Bob Ryan's Best Program in the History of Creation Award."

Compute! stated that Instant Music "breaks new ground in computer entertainment software" by making it easy for nonmusicians to play music ... it really must be seen to be believed." The reviewer reported that he had begun to play his electric guitar again with the Amiga as accompaniment.

Instant Music was mentioned in the Computer Music Journal as an example of an "intelligent instrument".

== Reviews ==
- Isaac Asimov's Science Fiction Magazine v12 n7 (1988 07)
