= Vbcc =

vbcc
- Developer: Volker Barthelmann
- Initial release: 1995; 31 years ago
- Stable release: 0.9h patch 3 / May 22, 2022; 3 years ago
- Written in: ANSI C
- Operating system: Multiplatform
- Type: Cross compiler
- License: Freeware for non-commercial use
- Website: www.compilers.de/vbcc.html

Left path toolchain of Motorola 68k, right path toolchain of PowerPC

vbcc is a portable and retargetable ANSI C compiler. It supports C89 (ISO/IEC 9899:1989) as well as parts of C99 (ISO/IEC 9899:1999).

It is divided into two parts. One is target-independent and the other is target-dependent. vbcc provides complete abstraction of host-arithmetic and target-arithmetic. It fully supports cross-compiling for 8-bit, 16-bit, 32-bit and 64-bit architectures.

Embedded systems are supported by features such as different pointer sizes, ROM-able code, inline assembly, bit-types, interrupt handlers, section attributes, and stack usage calculation (depending on the backend).

vbcc supports the following backends, with different degrees of maturity: 68k, ColdFire, PowerPC, 6502, 65C02, 65C816 (in native mode), VideoCore, 80x86 (386 and above), Alpha, C16x/ST10, 6809/6309/68HC12, and Z-machine.

The compiler itself can run on all common operating systems, including Windows, Mac OS X, and Unix/Linux.

== Optimizations ==
The compiler provides a large set of high-level optimizations as well as target-specific optimizations to produce faster or smaller code. It is also able to optimize across functions and modules. Target-independent optimizations supported by vbcc include:

- cross-module function inlining
- partial inlining of recursive functions
- interprocedural dataflow analysis
- interprocedural register allocation
- register allocation for global variables
- global common subexpression elimination
- global constant propagation
- global copy propagation
- dead code elimination
- alias analysis
- loop unrolling
- induction variable elimination
- loop-invariant code motion
- loop reversal
