= ARexx =

Interpreter for the Rexx language on an Amiga computer

- Original author: William S. Hawes
- Release: 1987; 39 years ago
- Written in: Motorola 68000 assembly
- Operating system: AmigaOS
- Platform: Amiga
- Included with: AmigaOS 2.0
- Type: Rexx interpreter
- License: Proprietary

ARexx is a Rexx interpreter for Amiga, written in 1987 by William S. Hawes, with a number of Amiga-specific features beyond standard Rexx. An ARexx script can communicate with software that implements an ARexx port. An Amiga application can define a set of commands and functions for ARexx to address, thus making the capabilities of the software available to an ARexx script. Several applications support running an ARexx script as a macro.

An ARexx script can execute commands and functions in multiple applications which allows a script to integrate the functionality of the applications. For example, an ARexx script could extract data from a database, insert the data into a spreadsheet to perform calculations on the data, then insert tables and charts based on the results into a word processor document.

ARexx allows a script to communicate with applications that are "ARexx compatible" – able to receive commands from ARexx and execute them. Notable examples include: the MicroFiche Filer database application provides extensive ARexx commands, the Textra editor supplied with JForth provides an integrated programming environment, and the AmigaVision multimedia presentation application can control other programs via ARexx.

As in standard Rexx, ARexx uses typeless data representation. Other programming languages distinguish types such as integer, floating point, string, but Rexx treats all data as text (string). This makes writing code easier, but leads to runtime inefficiency and errors. As is often the case in dynamically scoped languages, variables are not declared before using them. They are created on first use.

ARexx provides built-in commands and access to its host Amiga library (rexxsyslib.library) as well as other libraries and functions. An Amiga program with an ARexx port can serve its functionality to an ARexx script. An ARexx script can invoke other ARexx scripts.

== History ==
ARexx was created in 1987, developed for Amiga by William S. Hawes. It is based on the Rexx language described by Mike Cowlishaw in the book The REXX Language: A Practical Approach to Programming. ARexx was included by Commodore with AmigaOS 2.0 in 1990, and has been included with all subsequent AmigaOS releases. This later version of ARexx follows the official Rexx language closely; Hawes was later involved in drafting the ANSI standard for Rexx.

From the ARexx manual:

ARexx was developed on an Amiga 1000 computer with 512k bytes of
memory and two floppy disk drives. The language prototype was
developed in C using Lattice C, and the production version was written
in assembly-language using the Metacomco assembler. The documentation
was created using the TxEd editor, and was set in TeX using AmigaTeX.
This is a 100% Amiga product.

As ARexx is written in 68000 assembly language, it cannot function at full speed with PPC CPUs of MorphOS, a more modern descendant of Amiga. ARexx has not been rewritten for them and is still missing from MorphOS. William Hawes is no longer involved in development of Amiga software and no firm is financing new versions of ARexx. Notwithstanding, the existing version of ARexx continues to be used, although not distributed with MorphOS.

== Examples ==
=== Implement new capabilities ===
If a user is using a program which builds animations by joining various bitmap image files but which lacks image processing capabilities, they could write an ARexx script which performs these actions:

1. ARexx locates the image files in their directories
2. ARexx loads first image
3. ARexx loads paint program
4. The image is loaded into paint program which performs modifications to file
5. The modified image is stored into another directory
6. ARexx repeats procedure on any image in the directory
7. The paint program is closed and the animation program is loaded
8. The animation is built
9. The animation is saved in its directory
10. The animation program is closed

=== Automate repetitive tasks ===
EqFiles.rexx is a well-known example of a simple ARexx script written to automate repetitive and boring procedures. This script uses the ALeXcompare program to compare files, and then finds all duplicates in a set of files and returns output by highlighting any results in a different color.

=== Extend AmigaOS ===
A significant value of ARexx is extending AmigaOS by adding capabilities it lacks. For example, a ARexx program could display a warning message or play an audio alert sound if a certain Amiga program stops, faults or has finished its scheduled job.

The following script is a ARexx script that displays warnings depending on events:

/* Alarm.rexx */
ARG event
IF event = 0 THEN EXIT
IF event = 1 THEN SAY "Program has ended unexpectedly"
IF event = 2 THEN SAY "Program has finished its job"
IF event = 3 THEN SAY "Cannot find data in selected directory"
