= Lattice C =

Compiler for C programming language

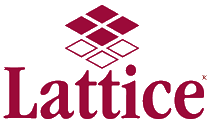
- Developer: Steve Krueger et al.
- Release: 1982; 44 years ago
- Written in: C, Assembly
- Operating system: DOS, OS/2, MVS, VMS, UNIX, AmigaOS, Sinclair QDOS, Atari TOS
- Type: Compiler
- License: Proprietary
- Website: support.sas.com/documentation/onlinedoc/sasc/

The Lattice C Compiler was a C compiler for the IBM Personal Computer released in June 1982 by Lifeboat Associates. The compiler sold for $500 (equivalent to $1,668 in 2025) and would run on PC DOS or MS-DOS (which at the time were the same product with different brandings). The first hardware requirements were given as 96KB of RAM and one (later two) floppy drives. It was ported to many other platforms, such as mainframes (MVS), minicomputers (VMS), workstations (UNIX), OS/2, Amiga, Atari ST, and Sinclair QL.

The compiler was subsequently repackaged by Microsoft under a distribution agreement as Microsoft C version 2.0. Microsoft developed their own C compiler that was released in April 1985 as Microsoft C Compiler 3.0. Lattice was purchased by SAS Institute in 1987 and rebranded as SAS/C. After this, support for other platforms dwindled until compiler development ceased for all platforms except IBM mainframes. The product is still available in versions that run on other platforms, but these are cross compilers that only produce mainframe code.

Some of the early 1982 commercial software for the IBM PC was ported from CP/M (where it was written for the BDS C subset of the C language) to MS-DOS using Lattice C including Perfect Writer, PerfectCalc, PerfectSpeller and PerfectFiler. This suite was bundled with the Seequa Chameleon and Columbia Data Products.

- LMK, make tool
- LSE, screen editor
- TMN, text management utilities

== Reception ==
In a 1983 review of five C compilers for the IBM PC, BYTE chose Lattice C as the best in the "superior quality, but expensive and unsuited to the beginner" category. It cited the software's "quick compile and execution times, small incremental code, best documentation and consistent reliability". PC Magazine that year similarly praised Lattice C's documentation and compile-time and runtime performance, and stated that it was slightly superior to the CI-C86 and c-systems C compilers.
