= PowerUP (accelerator) =

Series of accelerator boards for Amiga

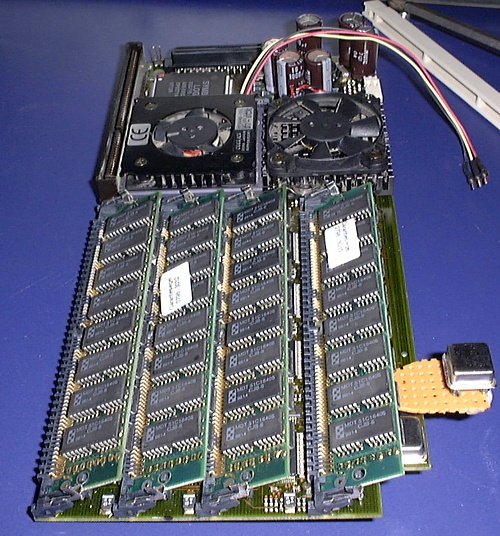
CyberStorm PPC604e accelerator board

PowerUP boards were dual-processor accelerator boards designed by Phase5 Digital Products for Amiga computers. They had two different processors, a Motorola 68000 series (68k) and a PowerPC, working in parallel, sharing the complete address space of the Amiga computer system.

== History ==
In 1995, Amiga Technologies GmbH announced they were going to port AmigaOS to PowerPC. As part of their Power Amiga plan, Amiga Technologies was going to launch new Power Amiga models using the PowerPC 604e reduced instruction set computer (RISC) CPU and in cooperation with Amiga Technologies Phase5 would release AmigaOS 4-compatible PowerPC accelerator boards for old Amiga 1200, Amiga 3000 and Amiga 4000 models. However, in 1996 Amiga Technologies' parent company ESCOM entered into deep financial problems and could not support Amiga development. Due to a lack of resources, the PowerPC project at Amiga Technologies stalled and Phase5 had to launch accelerators without a PowerPC-native AmigaOS. As a stopgap solution, a new PowerUP kernel was created allowing new PPC-native software run parallel with 68k Amiga OS. To complicate things even further, former Commodore International chief engineer Dave Haynie questioned Phase5's plans to develop PowerPC boards without Amiga Technologies: "Their approach on the software front is kind of a hack, and on the hardware front it's just too much like the old Commodore; at best, they'll wind up with interesting, non-standard, and overpriced machines that can't keep up with the rapid changes in the industry."

Nevertheless Phase5 had decided to go their own way and develop a PowerPC-based AmigaOS-compatible computer without Amiga Technologies. They also announced plans to write a new Amiga OS-compatible operating system. Wolf Dietrich (managing director of phase5) earlier commented that "we found that Amiga Technologies offers us no sort of outlook or basis for developing into the future".

There is no detailed information about how many PowerPC accelerator boards Phase5 (and later DCE) sold. According to Ralph Schmidt in an AmigActive article featuring MorphOS, there were about 10,000 people using Phase5 PowerPC accelerator boards. The unofficial PowerUP support page estimates similar figures.

== PowerUP software ==
PowerUP kernel is a multitasking kernel developed by Ralph Schmidt for Phase5 PowerPC accelerator boards. The kernel ran alongside the AmigaOS where PPC and 68k native software could run parallel.

The PowerUP kernel used Executable and Linkable Format (ELF) as the executable format and supported runtime linking, relocations and custom sections; it used GNU Compiler Collection (GCC) as its default compiler. This caused controversy in the Amiga community when developers thought that phase5 was bringing "too Unixish stuff" to Amiga. It was feared that PowerUP kernel introducing shared objects and dynamic linking would replace the original shared library model and shared objects were indeed adapted into AmigaOS.

Another controversy was caused by different designs and purposes of Blizzard PPC and Cyberstorm PPC boards. The Blizzard PPC was designed to fit Amiga 1200 as a standalone device which would not need installing additional software but utilised Amiga's unique Autoconfig feature. This caused problems to some 3rd party developers who developed their own PPC kernels for PowerUP cards since they could not work on Amiga 1200 without removing the PowerUP kernel first.

A few hundred titles were released for PowerUP including TurboPrint PPC, Amiga datatypes, MP3 and MPEG players, games (Quake and Doom video games to mention few) and various plugins including Flash Video plugin for Voyager web browser.

== PowerUP hardware ==
=== Blizzard 2604e ===
On May 12, 1997, Phase5 announced PowerUP accelerator board for the Amiga 2000 line of computers. The card never got past the prototype stage and hence never released to the public.

- PowerPC 604e at 150, 180 or 200 MHz
- 68040 at 25 MHz or 68060 at 50 MHz
- Four 72 pin SIMM sockets accepting 128 MB RAM, 64 bit wide
- Ultra Wide SCSI controller
- Expansion slot for the CyberVision PPC

=== Blizzard PPC ===
Also known as Blizzard 603e, this accelerator board was designed for the Amiga 1200 and plugged into the trapdoor slot. It used a low cost, low end PowerPC 603e processor designed for portable and embedded use.

- PowerPC 603e at 160, 200 or 240 MHz
- 68040 or 68LC040 at 25 MHz or 68060 at 50 MHz
- Two 72 pin SIMM sockets accepting 256 MB RAM, 32 bit wide
- SCSI II controller (Blizzard 603e+ models only)
- Expansion slot for the BlizzardVision PPC

=== CyberStorm PPC ===
This accelerator board was designed for the Amiga 3000 and Amiga 4000. The accelerator board was famous for its high performance due to its 64 bit wide memory bus and PowerPC 604e processor. According to Phase 5 it could sustain memory transfers up to 68 MB/s on the 68060 and up to 160 MB/s on the 604e.

- PowerPC 604e at 150, 180, 200 or 233 MHz
- 68040 at 25 MHz or 68060 at 50 MHz
- Four 72 pin SIMM sockets accepting 128 MB RAM, 64 bit wide
- Ultra Wide SCSI controller
- Expansion slot for the CyberVision PPC

=== CyberVision PPC, BlizzardVision PPC ===
CyberVision PPC and BlizzardVision PPC (BVision PPC) were graphics board add-ons for the CyberStorm PPC and Blizzard PPC accelerator boards. The BlizzardVision PPC could be installed into an Amiga 1200 desktop case. They had a random-access memory (RAM) digital-to-analog converter (DAC, RAMDAC) with a bandwidth of 230 MHz able to display resolutions with 80 Hz vertical refresh rate up to 1152×900 pixels at 24 bits, or 1600×1200 pixels at 16 bits.

- Permedia 2 GPU
- 8 MB 64-bit-wide SGRAM
- 3D LCD shutter glass connector
- CyberGraphX V3 drivers
- CyberGL 3D library

Resolution	8 bits	16 bits	32 bits
640 × 480	60 – 140 Hz	60 – 140 Hz	60 – 120 Hz
800 × 600	60 – 120 Hz	60 – 120 Hz	60 – 120 Hz
1024 × 768	75 – 120 Hz	75 – 120 Hz	75 – 120 Hz
1152 × 900	75 – 120 Hz	75 – 100 Hz	75 – 100 Hz
1280 × 1024	60 – 100 Hz	60 – 90 Hz	N/A
1600 × 1200	60 – 80 Hz	60 – 75 Hz	N/A
