= Variadic =

Property of accepting a variable number of arguments

In computer science, a variadic function, operator, or other construct is one that accepts a variable number of arguments; that is, its arity is not fixed. Variadic constructs are commonly used in programming languages to provide flexible interfaces that can operate on varying numbers of inputs.

The term variadic is a neologism, dating back to 1936/1937. The term was not widely used until the 1970s.

== See also ==
- Variadic function – Function with variable number of arguments
- Variadic macro – Macro taking a varying number of arguments
- Variadic template – Templates in computer programming
- Arity – Number of arguments required by a function
