= Stdarg.h =

Header file for C programs

<stdarg.h> is a header in the C standard library of the C programming language that allows functions to accept an indefinite number of arguments. It provides facilities for stepping through a list of function arguments of unknown number and type. C++ provides this functionality in the header <cstdarg>.

The contents of <stdarg.h> are typically used in variadic functions, though they may be used in other functions (for example, vprintf) called by variadic functions.

== Creating variadic functions ==
Variadic functions are functions which may take a variable number of arguments and are declared with an ellipsis in place of the last parameter. An example of such a function is printf. Respectively, declarations and definitions are done similarly as such

int check(int a, double b, ...);

int check(int a, double b, ...) {
    // ...
}

According to the standard, varadic functions without any named parameters are not allowed in C17 and earlier, but in C++ and C23 such a declaration is permitted.

In C, a comma must precede the ellipsis if a named parameter is specified, while in C++ it was optional until C++26 when this was deprecated.

Some K&R C style function declarations do not use ellipses.

== stdarg.h types ==
Name	Description	Compatibility
va_list	type for iterating arguments	C89

== stdarg.h macros ==
Name	Description	compatibility
va_start	Start iterating arguments with a va_list	C89
va_arg	Retrieve an argument	C89
va_end	Free a va_list	C89
va_copy	Copy contents of one va_list to another	C99

== Accessing the arguments ==
According to the standard, to access the unnamed arguments it can be through a variable of type va_list in the variadic function, with macro va_start also provided as the last named parameter of the function. In C23 the second argument is optional and will not be evaluated. After this, each invocation of the va_arg macro yields the next argument. The first argument to va_arg is the va_list and the second is the type of the next argument passed to the function. As the last step, the va_end macro must be called on the va_list before the function returns. Note that it is not required to read in all the arguments.

C99 provides an additional macro, va_copy, which can duplicate the state of a va_list. The macro invocation va_copy(va2, va1) copies va1 into va2.

There is no defined method for counting or classifying the unnamed arguments passed to the variadic function. The function should simply determine this somehow, the means of which vary. Common conventions include:

- Use of a printf or scanf-like format string with embedded specifiers that indicate argument types.
- A sentinel value at the end of the variadic arguments.
- A count argument indicating the number of variadic arguments.

=== Passing unnamed arguments to other calls ===
As the size of the unnamed argument list is generally unknown, the calling conventions employed by most compilers do not permit determining the size of the unnamed argument block pointed at by va_list inside the receiving function. As a result there is also no reliable, generic way to forward the unnamed arguments into another variadic function. Even where determining the size of the argument list is possible by indirect means (for example, by parsing the format string of fprintf()), there is no portable way to pass the dynamically determined number of arguments into the inner variadic call, as the number and size of arguments passed into such calls must generally be known at compile time. To some extent, this restriction can be relaxed by employing variadic macros instead of variadic functions. Additionally, most standard library procedures provide v-prefixed alternative versions which accept a reference to the unnamed argument list (i.e. an initialized va_list variable) instead of the unnamed argument list itself. For example, vfprintf() is an alternate version of fprintf() expecting a va_list instead of the actual unnamed argument list. A user-defined variadic function can therefore initialize a va_list variable using va_start and pass it to an appropriate standard library function, in effect passing the unnamed argument list by reference instead of doing it by value. Because there is no reliable way to pass unnamed argument lists by value in C, providing variadic API functions without also providing equivalent functions accepting va_list instead is considered a bad programming practice.

== Type safety ==
Some C implementations provide C extensions that allow the compiler to check for the proper use of format strings and sentinels. Barring these extensions, the compiler usually cannot check whether the unnamed arguments passed are of the type the function expects, or convert them to the required type. Therefore, care should be taken to ensure correctness in this regard, since undefined behavior results if the types do not match. For example, if the expected type is int*, then a null pointer should be passed as (int*)NULL. Writing just NULL would result in an argument of type either int or void*, neither of which is correct. Another consideration is the default argument promotions applied to the unnamed arguments. A float will automatically be promoted to a double. Likewise, arguments of types narrower than an int will be promoted to int or unsigned int. The function receiving the unnamed arguments must expect the promoted type.

GCC has an attribute that checks the passed arguments: [[gnu::format(style, format_index, first_to_check)]]. The format attribute specifies that a function takes printf, scanf, strftime or strfmon style arguments which should be type-checked against a format string. For example, the declaration:

[[gnu::format(printf, 2, 3)]]
extern int my_printf(void* obj, const char* fmt, ...);

causes the compiler to check the arguments in calls to my_printf for consistency with the printf style format string argument my_format.

== Example ==
#include <stdio.h>
#include <stdarg.h>

// Get sum of variables
int sum(int count, ...) {
    va_list ap;
    int total = 0;
    va_start(ap, count); 
    for (int i = 0; i < count; i++) {
        total += va_arg(ap, int);
    }
    va_end(ap);
    return total;
}

int main(void) {
   printf("%i", sum(2, 1, 3));
   return 0;
}

This program should get the following output:

4

== <varargs.h> ==
Outdated versions of POSIX defined the legacy header <varargs.h>, which dates from before the standardization of C and provides functionality similar to <stdarg.h>. This header is part of neither ISO C nor POSIX. The file, as defined in the second version of the Single UNIX Specification, simply contains all of the functionality of C89 <stdarg.h>, with the exceptions that:

- it cannot be used in standard C new-style definitions
- the given argument may be omitted (standard C requires at least one argument)

The interface is also different. For printargs example, one would instead write:

#include <stdio.h>
#include <varargs.h>

/**
 * This is K&R C (pre-C89).
 * There is no "void" type; use an implicit int return.
 */
printargs(arg1, va_alist)
    va_dcl /* no semicolon here! */
{
    va_list ap;
    int i = 0;

    va_start(ap); /* only the va_list is given! */
    for (i = arg1; i >= 0; i = va_arg(ap, int)) {
        printf("%d ", i);
    }
    va_end(ap);
    putchar('\n');
    return;
}

and is called the same way.

varargs.h requires old-style function definitions because of the way the implementation works. Conversely, it is not possible to mix old-style function definitions with stdarg.h.
