= Karl Lehenbauer =

American businessman (born 1958)

Karl Lehenbauer (born April 5, 1958) was the founder of NeoSoft in the early 1990s, which was the first Internet service provider in the southern United States as well as the first to offer cable modem service in Houston, Texas, among other technological milestones. NeoSoft was later sold to Internet America in 1999. Lehenbauer also wrote the Internet (socket) capabilities of the Tcl programming language.

Lehenbauer has been contributing to the development of Internet software and protocols since 1986. Lehenbauer is the co-creator of the TclX Tcl extension, much of which has now been incorporated into Tcl. Lehenbauer served as the CTO of Superconnect, an enterprise cable/telecom monitoring software company.

Lehenbauer was the CTO of FlightAware, an aviation data and flight tracking company, from 2005 to 2021.

== Recent software projects ==
Lehenbauer founded or is a major contributor to the following Internet software projects:

- Apache Rivet (Modern fork of NeoWebScript)
- Pgtcl (Tcl interface to PostgreSQL)
- LdapTcl (Tcl interface to LDAP)
- NeoWebScript (Apache module for Tcl scripting in web pages)

== Personal ==
Lehenbauer lives in Houston, Texas with his wife and two daughters. He is an avid philanthropist, cyclist, and musician .

== Recent appearances ==
- BSDCan Keynote (2014)
- Tcl Conference Keynote (2013)
- BSDTalk Interview (May 2006)
- SXSW 2004
