= Tkdesk =

Unix graphical file manager

TkDesk, released under the GNU GPL, is a graphical file manager for the X Window System, a standard component of Unix and Unix-like systems. TkDesk saw its last update in 2004.

It is highly configurable, since it is based upon Tcl and Tk.
