= XOTcl =

- Paradigm: multi-paradigm: object-oriented, functional, Imperative, event-driven programming
- Designed by: Gustaf Neumann and Uwe Zdun
- First appeared: 2000
- Stable release: 1.6.8 / 29 April 2014; 12 years ago
- Typing discipline: dynamic typing, everything can be treated as a string
- Website: media.wu-wien.ac.at

Influenced by
- Tcl, OTcl

XOTcl is an object-oriented extension for the Tool Command Language created by Gustaf Neumann and Uwe Zdun. It is a derivative of MIT OTcl and is based on a dynamic object system with metaclasses influenced by CLOS. Class and method definitions in XOTcl are completely dynamic. The language also provides support for design patterns through filters and decorator mixins.

== See also ==
- OTcl
- incr Tcl
- Tcl
- Tcllib
- C++/Tcl
- Itk
- Tk
