= Incr Tcl =

Object-oriented extensions for the Tcl programming language

Itcl
- Paradigm: multi-paradigm: object-oriented, functional, Imperative, event-driven programming
- Designed by: Michael McLennan
- Developer: Michael McLennan
- First appeared: 1993
- Stable release: Itcl4.1.1 / 21 December 2017; 8 years ago
- Typing discipline: dynamic typing, everything can be treated as a string
- License: BSD-style
- Website: itcl at SourceForge

Influenced by
- Tcl, C++

incr Tcl (commonly stylised as [incr Tcl], and often abbreviated to itcl) is a set of object-oriented extensions for the Tcl programming language. It is widely used among the Tcl community, and is generally regarded as industrial strength. Its name is a pun on "C++". Itcl implementations exist as both a package that may be dynamically loaded by a Tcl application, as well as an independent standalone language with its own interpreter.

== Overview ==
=== Features ===
==== Namespace support ====
Itcl allows namespaces to be used for organizing commands and variables.

Example:

package require Itcl
    
itcl::class Toaster {
    variable crumbs 0
    method toast {nslices} {
        if {$crumbs > 50} {
            error "== FIRE! FIRE! =="
        }
        set crumbs [expr $crumbs+4*$nslices]
    }
    method clean {} {
        set crumbs 0
    }
}
    
itcl::class SmartToaster {
    inherit Toaster
    method toast {nslices} {
        if {$crumbs > 40} {
            clean
        }
        return [chain $nslices]
    }
}
    
set toaster [SmartToaster #auto]
$toaster toast 2

==== C code integration ====
Itcl (like Tcl) has built-in support for the integration of C code into Itcl classes.

== See also ==
- OTcl
- XOTcl
- Tcllib
- Itk
- Tk (framework)
