= Clock signal =

Electronic signal to synchronize circuits

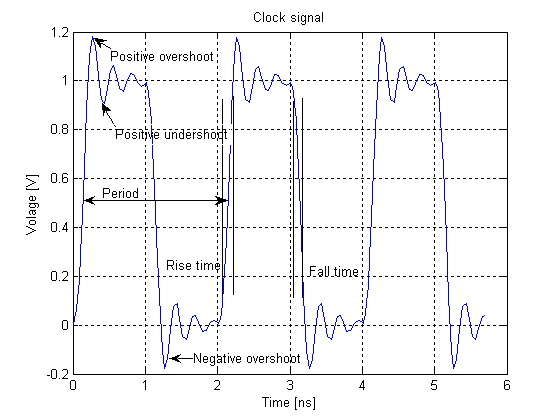
Clock signal and legend

In electronics and especially synchronous digital circuits, a clock signal (historically also known as logic beat) is an electronic logic signal (voltage or current) which oscillates between a high and a low state at a constant frequency and is used like a metronome to synchronize actions of digital circuits. In a synchronous logic circuit, the most common type of digital circuit, the clock signal is applied to all storage devices, flip-flops and latches, and causes them all to change state simultaneously, preventing race conditions.

A clock signal is produced by an electronic oscillator called a clock generator. The most common clock signal is in the form of a square wave with a 50% duty cycle. Circuits using the clock signal for synchronization may become active at either the rising edge, falling edge, or, in the case of double data rate, both in the rising and in the falling edges of the clock cycle.

== Digital circuits ==
Most integrated circuits (ICs) of sufficient complexity use a clock signal in order to synchronize different parts of the circuit, cycling at a rate slower than the worst-case internal propagation delays. In some cases, more than one clock cycle is required to perform a predictable action. As ICs become more complex, the problem of supplying accurate and synchronized clocks to all the circuits becomes increasingly difficult. The preeminent example of such complex chips is the microprocessor, the central component of modern computers, which relies on a clock from a crystal oscillator. The only exceptions are asynchronous circuits such as asynchronous CPUs.

A clock signal might also be gated, that is, combined with a controlling signal that enables or disables the clock signal for a certain part of a circuit. This technique is often used to save power by effectively shutting down portions of a digital circuit when they are not in use, but comes at a cost of increased complexity in timing analysis.

=== Single-phase clock ===
Most modern synchronous circuits use only a single-phase clock – in other words, all clock signals are (effectively) transmitted on a single wire.

=== Two-phase clock ===
In synchronous circuits, a two-phase clock refers to clock signals distributed on two wires, each with non-overlapping pulses. Traditionally, one wire is called phase 1 or φ1 (phi1), and the other wire carries the phase 2 or φ2 signal. Because the two phases are guaranteed non-overlapping, gated latches rather than edge-triggered flip-flops can be used to store state information so long as the inputs to latches on one phase only depend on outputs from latches on the other phase. Since a gated latch uses only four gates versus six gates for an edge-triggered flip-flop, a two-phase clock can lead to a design with a smaller overall gate count, but usually at some penalty in design difficulty and performance.

Metal oxide semiconductor (MOS) ICs typically used dual clock signals (a two-phase clock) in the 1970s. These were generated externally for both the Motorola 6800 and Intel 8080 microprocessors. The next generation of microprocessors incorporated the clock generation on chip. The 8080 uses a 2 MHz clock but the processing throughput is similar to the 1 MHz 6800. The 8080 requires more clock cycles to execute a processor instruction. Due to their dynamic logic, the 6800 has a minimum clock rate of 100 kHz and the 8080 has a minimum clock rate of 500 kHz. Higher speed versions of both microprocessors were released by 1976.

The 6501 requires an external 2-phase clock generator. The MOS Technology 6502 uses the same 2-phase logic internally, but also includes a 2-phase clock generator on-chip, so it only needs a single-phase clock input, simplifying system design.

=== 4-phase clock ===
Some early integrated circuits use four-phase logic, requiring a four-phase clock input consisting of four separate, non-overlapping clock signals. This was particularly common among early microprocessors such as the National Semiconductor IMP-16, Texas Instruments TMS9900, and the Western Digital MCP-1600 chipset used in the DEC LSI-11.

Four-phase clocks have only rarely been used in newer CMOS processors such as the DEC WRL MultiTitan microprocessor. and in Intrinsity's Fast14 technology. Most modern microprocessors and microcontrollers use a single-phase clock.

=== Clock multiplier ===
Many modern microcomputers use a "clock multiplier" which multiplies a lower frequency external clock to the appropriate clock rate of the microprocessor. This allows the CPU to operate at a much higher frequency than the rest of the computer, which affords performance gains in situations where the CPU does not need to wait on an external factor (like memory or input/output).

=== Dynamic frequency change ===
The vast majority of digital devices do not require a clock at a fixed, constant frequency. As long as the minimum and maximum clock periods are respected, the time between clock edges can vary widely from one edge to the next and back again. Such digital devices work just as well with a clock generator that dynamically changes its frequency, such as spread-spectrum clock generation, dynamic frequency scaling, etc. Devices that use static logic do not even have a minimum clock frequency; such devices can be slowed and paused indefinitely, then resumed at full clock speed at any time.

== Other circuits ==
Some sensitive mixed-signal circuits, such as precision analog-to-digital converters, use sine waves rather than square waves as their clock signals, because square waves contain high-frequency harmonics that can interfere with the analog circuitry and cause noise. Such sine wave clocks are often differential signals, because this type of signal has twice the slew rate, and therefore half the timing uncertainty, of a single-ended signal with the same voltage range. Differential signals radiate less strongly than a single line. Alternatively, a single line shielded by power and ground lines can be used.

In CMOS circuits, gate capacitances are charged and discharged continually. A capacitor does not dissipate energy, but energy is wasted in the driving transistors. In reversible computing, inductors can be used to store this energy and reduce the energy loss, but they tend to be quite large. Alternatively, using a sine wave clock, CMOS transmission gates and energy-saving techniques, the power requirements can be reduced.

== Distribution ==
The most effective way to get the clock signal to every part of a chip that needs it, with the lowest skew, is a metal grid. In a large microprocessor, the power used to drive the clock signal can be over 30% of the total power used by the entire chip. The whole structure with the gates at the ends and all amplifiers in between have to be loaded and unloaded every cycle. To save energy, clock gating temporarily shuts off part of the tree.

The clock distribution network (or clock tree, when this network forms a tree such as an H-tree) distributes the clock signal(s) from a common point to all the elements that need it. Since this function is vital to the operation of a synchronous system, much attention has been given to the characteristics of these clock signals and the electrical networks used in their distribution. Clock signals are often regarded as simple control signals; however, these signals have some very special characteristics and attributes.

Clock signals are typically loaded with the greatest fanout and operate at the highest speeds of any signal within the synchronous system. Since the data signals are provided with a temporal reference by the clock signals, the clock waveforms must be particularly clean and sharp. Furthermore, these clock signals are particularly affected by technology scaling (see Moore's law), in that long global interconnect lines become significantly more resistive as line dimensions are decreased. This increased line resistance is one of the primary reasons for the increasing significance of clock distribution on synchronous performance. Finally, the control of any differences and uncertainty in the arrival times of the clock signals can severely limit the maximum performance of the entire system and create race conditions in which an incorrect data signal may latch within a register.

Most synchronous digital systems consist of cascaded banks of sequential registers with combinational logic between each set of registers. The functional requirements of the digital system are satisfied by the logic stages. Each logic stage introduces delay that affects timing performance, and the timing performance of the digital design can be evaluated relative to the timing requirements by a timing analysis. Often special considerations must be given in order to meet the timing requirements. For example, the global performance and local timing requirements may be satisfied by the careful insertion of pipeline registers into equally spaced time windows to satisfy critical worst-case timing constraints. A proper design of the clock distribution network helps ensure that critical timing requirements are satisfied and that no race conditions exist (see also clock skew).

The delay components that make up a general synchronous system are composed of three individual subsystems: the memory storage elements, the logic elements, and the clocking circuitry and distribution network.

Novel structures are currently under development to ameliorate these issues and provide effective solutions. Important areas of research include resonant clocking techniques ("resonant clock mesh"), on-chip optical interconnect, and local synchronization methodologies.

== See also ==
- Bit-synchronous operation – Digital communication using a clock-synchronized bit stream
- Clock domain crossing – Crossing in digital electronic design
- Clock rate – Frequency at which a CPU chip or core is operating
- Design flow (EDA) – Suite of electronic design tools
- Electronic design automation – Software for designing electronic systems
- Four-phase logic
- Integrated circuit design – Engineering process for electronic hardware
- Interface logic model
- Jitter – Clock deviation from perfect periodicity
- Pulse-per-second signal – Class of electrical signals
- Timecode – Numeric codes generated at regular intervals
- Self-clocking signal – Signal able to be decoded without an outside source of synchronization
