= Bit-synchronous operation =

Digital communication using a clock-synchronized bit stream

Bit-synchronous operation is a type of digital communication in which the data circuit-terminating equipment (DCE), data terminal equipment (DTE), and transmitting circuits are all operated in bit-synchronism with a clock signal.

In bit-synchronous operation, clock timing is usually delivered at twice the modulation rate, and one bit is transmitted or received during each clock cycle.

Bit-synchronous operation is sometimes erroneously referred to as digital synchronization.
