= TclX =

Tcl extension to the Tcl programming language

TclX, an abbreviation for extended Tcl, was one of the first freely available Tcl extensions to the Tcl programming language, providing new operating system interface commands, extended file controls, time and date manipulation, scanning and status commands and many others. While many features of TclX have been incorporated into Tcl, TclX continued to be updated, providing Tcl interfaces to many Unix/Linux system calls and library routines, expanded list functions, and so forth. No new releases have been issued since November 2012, with 8.4.1 being the latest; however, version 8.6 is in preparation.

TclX is shipped by Debian and as part of Mac OS X. It is also available as an RPM for Red Hat Enterprise Linux, Fedora, openSUSE, and the Mandriva versions of Linux, and as a port for FreeBSD, among others.

TclX was developed by Karl Lehenbauer and Mark Diekhans.
