= Variadic function =

Function with variable number of arguments

In mathematics and in computer programming, a variadic function is a function of indefinite arity, i.e., one which accepts a variable number of arguments. Support for variadic functions differs widely among programming languages.

== Overview ==
There are many mathematical and logical operations that come across naturally as variadic functions. For instance, the summing of numbers or the concatenation of strings or other sequences are operations that can be thought of as applicable to any number of operands (even though formally in these cases the associative property is applied).

Another operation that has been implemented as a variadic function in many languages is output formatting. The C function printf and the Common Lisp function format are two such examples. Both take one argument that specifies the formatting of the output, and any number of arguments that provide the values to be formatted.

Variadic functions can expose type-safety problems in some languages. For instance, C's printf, if used incautiously, can give rise to a class of security holes known as format string attacks. The attack is possible because the language support for variadic functions is not type-safe: it permits the function to attempt to pop more arguments off the stack than were placed there, corrupting the stack and leading to unexpected behavior. As a consequence of this, the CERT Coordination Center considers variadic functions in C to be a high-severity security risk.

In functional programming languages, variadics can be considered complementary to the apply function, which takes a function and a list/sequence/array as arguments, and calls the function with the arguments supplied in that list, thus passing a variable number of arguments to the function. In the functional language Haskell, variadic functions can be implemented by returning a value of a type class T; if instances of T are a final return value r and a function (T t) => x -> t, this allows for any number of additional arguments x.

A related subject in term rewriting research is called hedges, or hedge variables. Unlike variadics, which are functions with arguments, hedges are sequences of arguments themselves. They also can have constraints ('take no more than 4 arguments', for example) to the point where they are not variable-length (such as 'take exactly 4 arguments') - thus calling them variadics can be misleading. However they are referring to the same phenomenon, and sometimes the phrasing is mixed, resulting in names such as variadic variable (synonymous to hedge). Note the double meaning of the word variable and the difference between arguments and variables in functional programming and term rewriting. For example, a term (function) can have three variables, one of them a hedge, thus allowing the term to take three or more arguments (or two or more if the hedge is allowed to be empty).

== Examples ==
=== C ===
To portably implement variadic functions in the C language, the standard <stdarg.h> header file is used. The older <varargs.h> header has been deprecated in favor of <stdarg.h>. In C++, the header file <cstdarg> is used.

#include <stdarg.h>
#include <stdio.h>

double average(int count, ...) {
    va_list ap;
    double sum = 0;

    va_start(ap, count); // Before C23: Requires the last fixed parameter (to get the address)
    for (int j = 0; j < count; ++j) {
        sum += va_arg(ap, int); // Increments ap to the next argument
    }
    va_end(ap);

    return sum / count;
}

int main(int argc, char* argv[]) {
    printf("%f\n", average(3, 1, 2, 3));
    return 0;
}

This will compute the average of an arbitrary number of arguments. Note that the function does not know the number of arguments or their types. The above function expects that the types will be int, and that the number of arguments is passed in the first argument (this is a frequent usage but by no means enforced by the language or compiler). In some other cases, for example printf, the number and types of arguments are figured out from a format string. In both cases, this depends on the programmer to supply the correct information. (Alternatively, a sentinel value like NULL or nullptr may be used to indicate the end of the parameter list.) If fewer arguments are passed in than the function believes, or the types of arguments are incorrect, this could cause it to read into invalid areas of memory and can lead to vulnerabilities like the format string attack. Depending on the system, even using NULL as a sentinel may encounter such problems; nullptr or a dedicated null pointer of the correct target type may be used to avoid them.

<stdarg.h> declares a type, va_list, and defines four macros: va_start, va_arg, va_copy, and va_end. Each invocation of va_start and va_copy must be matched by a corresponding invocation of va_end. When working with variable arguments, a function normally declares a variable of type va_list (ap in the example) that will be manipulated by the macros.

1. va_start takes two arguments, a va_list object and a reference to the function's last parameter (the one before the ellipsis; the macro uses this to get its bearings). In C23, the second argument will no longer be required and variadic functions will no longer need a named parameter before the ellipsis. (Note: Making the named parameter optional was needed since there was no way to specify a function taking an unspecified number of arguments in C23 after the removal of K&R style function definitions. Since C++ was already using this syntax for the same purpose, this change was also a way to increase compatibility between the languages.) It initialises the va_list object for use by va_arg or va_copy. The compiler will normally issue a warning if the reference is incorrect (e.g. a reference to a different parameter than the last one, or a reference to a wholly different object), but will not prevent compilation from completing normally.
2. va_arg takes two arguments, a va_list object (previously initialised) and a type descriptor. It expands to the next variable argument, and has the specified type. Successive invocations of va_arg allow processing each of the variable arguments in turn. Unspecified behavior occurs if the type is incorrect or there is no next variable argument.
3. va_end takes one argument, a va_list object. It serves to clean up. If one wanted to, for instance, scan the variable arguments more than once, the programmer would re-initialise your va_list object by invoking va_end and then va_start again on it.
4. va_copy takes two arguments, both of them va_list objects. It clones the second (which must have been initialised) into the first. Going back to the "scan the variable arguments more than once" example, this could be achieved by invoking va_start on a first va_list, then using va_copy to clone it into a second va_list. After scanning the variable arguments a first time with va_arg and the first va_list (disposing of it with va_end), the programmer could scan the variable arguments a second time with va_arg and the second va_list. va_end needs to also be called on the cloned va_list before the containing function returns.

=== C# ===
C# describes variadic functions using the params keyword on an array parameter. A type must be provided for the arguments, although object[] can be used as a catch-all. At the calling site, the arguments can either be listed one by one, or be passed a pre-existing array having the required element type. Using the variadic form is syntactic sugar for the latter.

namespace Wikipedia.Examples;

using System;

public class Program
{
    static int Foo(int a, int b, params int[] args)
    {
        // Return the sum of the integers in args, ignoring a and b.
        int sum = 0;
        foreach (int i in args)
        {
            sum += i;
        }
        return sum;
    }
        
    static void Main(string[] args)
    {
        Console.WriteLine(Foo(1, 2)); // 0
        Console.WriteLine(Foo(1, 2, 3, 10, 20)); // 33
        int[] manyValues = [13, 14, 15];
        Console.WriteLine(Foo(1, 2, manyValues)); // 42
    }
}

=== C++ ===
The basic variadic facility in C++ is largely identical to that in C. Prior to C++26, the comma before the ellipsis could be omitted. C++ also allows variadic functions without named parameters (for example, void f(...);). However, until C++26 there was no portable way to access those arguments, because va_start required the name of the last fixed parameter of the function. Since C++26, C++ adopts the one-argument form of va_start, matching C23 and allowing access to the arguments even when the function has no fixed parameters.

Variadic templates (parameter pack) can also be used in C++ with language built-in fold expressions. Variadic templates are the only type-safe way to have variadic functions/parameters in C++, as C++ lacks Java-style non-template variadic parameters; these variadic templates are heterogeneous.

import std;

template <typename... Ts>
void printAllArgs(Ts... args) {
    ((std::print("{} ", args)), ...);
}

int main(int argc, char* argv[]) {
    printAllArgs(1, 3.14f); // 1 3.14
    printAllArgs("Foo", 'b', true, nullptr); // Foo b true nullptr
}

The CERT Coding Standards for C++ strongly prefers the use of variadic templates (parameter pack) in C++ over the C-style variadic function due to a lower risk of misuse.

To constrain the parameter packs to homogeneous and be only of type T (similar to T... args) in Java, one can use the concept std::same_as<T, U> or std::convertible_to<From, To> (for types which may be intended to be convertible).

using std::same_as;

// Equivalent to Java signature
// <T> void foo(T... args);
template <typename T>
void foo(same_as<T> auto... args) {
    // ...
}

A proposal for "homogeneous variadic function parameters" proposes the Java-style form (T... args) directly; this was first proposed for C++20 in 2019, but abandoned, and then re-proposed for C++29 in 2026. Variadic parameter packs can be indexed with the indexing operator (for example T nth = args...[N - 1];); homogeneous packs must be the only function parameter pack, appear at the end, and cannot have C-style variadics.

// Equivalent to Java signature
// <T> T total(T... args);
template <typename T>
T total(T... args) {
    return (T{} + ... + args);
}

int sum(int... nums) {
    return (0 + ... + nums);
}

=== Carbon ===
Carbon, a language designed with interoperability with C++ in mind, offers variadics, in particular pack expansions.

// Takes an arbitrary number of vectors with arbitrary element types, and
// returns a vector of tuples where the i-th element of the vector is
// a tuple of the i-th elements of the input vectors.
fn Zip[... each ElementType:! type](... each vector: Vector(each ElementType)) -> Vector((... each ElementType)) {
    ... var each iter: auto = each vector.Begin();
    var result: Vector((... each ElementType));
    while (...and each iter != each vector.End()) {
        result.push_back((... each iter));
        ... each iter++;
    }
    return result;
}

=== Fortran ===
Since the Fortran 90 revision, Fortran functions or subroutines can accept optional arguments: the argument list is still fixed, but the ones that have the optional attribute can be omitted in the function/subroutine call. The intrinsic function present() can be used to detect the presence of an optional argument. The optional arguments can appear anywhere in the argument list.

program test
implicit none

    real :: x
    
    !> all arguments are passed:
    call foo( 1, 2, 3.0, 4, x )
    !< outputs 1 \ 2 \ 3.0 \ 4 \ 6.0 (the "\" denotes a newline)
    
    !> the last 2 arguments are omitted:
    call foo( 1, 2, 3.0 )
    !< outputs 1 \ 2 \ 3.0
    
    !> the 2nd and 4th arguments are omitted: the arguments that are positioned after 
    !> an omitted argument must be passed with a keyword:
    call foo( 1, c=3.0, e=x ) 
    !< outputs 1 \ 3.0 \ 6.0
    
    !> alternatively, the Fortran 2023 revision has introduced the .NIL. pseudo constant
    !> to denote an omitted argument
    call foo( 1, .NIL., 3.0, .NIL., x )
    !< outputs 1 \ 3.0 \ 6.0

contains

    !> the subroutine foo() has 2 mandatory and 3 optional arguments
    subroutine foo( a, b, c, d, e )
        integer, intent(in)            :: a 
        integer, intent(in),  optional :: b
        real,    intent(in)            :: c
        integer, intent(in),  optional :: d
        real,    intent(out), optional :: e
        
        print*, a
        if (present(b)) print*, b 
        print*, c
        if (present(d)) print*, d
        if (present(e)) then
            e = 2*c
            print*, c
        end if
    end subroutine

end program

=== Go ===
Variadic functions in Go can be called with any number of trailing arguments. fmt.Println is a common variadic function; it uses an empty interface as a catch-all type.

package main

import "fmt"

// This variadic function takes an arbitrary number of ints as arguments.
func sum(nums ...int) {
	fmt.Print("The sum of ", nums) // Also a variadic function.
	total := 0
	for _, num := range nums {
		total += num
	}
	fmt.Println(" is", total) // Also a variadic function.
}

func main() {
	// Variadic functions can be called in the usual way with individual
	// arguments.
	sum(1, 2)  // "The sum of [1 2] is 3"
	sum(1, 2, 3) // "The sum of [1 2 3] is 6"

	// If you already have multiple args in a slice, apply them to a variadic
	// function using func(slice...) like this.
	nums := []int{1, 2, 3, 4}
	sum(nums...) // "The sum of [1 2 3 4] is 10"
}

Output:

The sum of [1 2] is 3 
The sum of [1 2 3] is 6 
The sum of [1 2 3 4] is 10

=== Java ===
As with C#, the java.lang.Object type in Java is available as a catch-all.

In Java, a parameter can be variadic using the ellipsis notation. This is essentially equivalent to an array, however it does not require wrapping as an array. For example, String... args and String[] args would be essentially identical.

package org.wikipedia.examples;

public class Program {
    // Variadic methods store any additional arguments they receive in an array.
    // Consequentially, `printArgs` is actually a method with one parameter: a
    // variable-length array of `String`s.
    private static void printArgs(String... strings) {
        for (String s : strings) {
            System.out.println(s);
        }
    }

    public static void main(String[] args) {
        printArgs("hello"); // short for printArgs(new String[] {"hello"})
        printArgs("hello", "world"); // short for printArgs(new String[] {"hello", "world"})
        printArgs(args); // prints the entire args array
    }
}

This additionally means that the entry point may have the signature public static void main(String... args);.

=== JavaScript ===
JavaScript does not care about types of variadic arguments. The variadic argument is denoted with ..., which denotes a "rest parameter" which collects the arguments into an array.

function sum(...numbers) {
    return numbers.reduce((a, b) => a + b, 0);
}

console.log(sum(1, 2, 3)); // 6
console.log(sum(3, 2)); // 5
console.log(sum()); // 0

It is also possible to create a variadic function using the arguments object, although it is only usable with functions created with the function keyword.

function sum() {
    return Array.prototype.reduce.call(arguments, (a, b) => a + b, 0);
}

console.log(sum(1, 2, 3)); // 6
console.log(sum(3, 2)); // 5
console.log(sum()); // 0

Note that in TypeScript, because the rest parameter is an array, this is denoted as so:

function sum(...numbers: number[]): number {
    return numbers.reduce((a, b) => a + b, 0);
}

TypeScript also allows forcing the rest parameter to have an exact number of elements (i.e. a tuple):

// Forces exactly three numbers
function sumExactlyThree(...numbers: [number, number, number]): number {
    return numbers.reduce((a, b) => a + b, 0);
}

// Forces at least two numbers
function sumAtLeastTwo(...numbers: [number, number, ...number[]]): number {
    return numbers.reduce((a, b) => a + b, 0);
}

// Forces the first argument to be a string, then anything after
function log(...args: [string, ...any[]]) {
    // ...
}

=== Lua ===
Lua functions may pass varargs to other functions the same way as other values using the return keyword. tables can be passed into variadic functions by using, in Lua version 5.2 or higher table.unpack, or Lua 5.1 or lower unpack. Varargs can be used as a table by constructing a table with the vararg as a value.

function sum(...) --... designates varargs
   local sum=0
   for _,v in pairs({...}) do --creating a table with a varargs is the same as creating one with standard values
      sum=sum+v
   end
   return sum
end

values={1,2,3,4}
sum(5,table.unpack(values)) --returns 15. table.unpack should go after any other arguments, otherwise not all values will be passed into the function.

function add5(...)
  return ...+5 --this is incorrect usage of varargs, and will only return the first value provided
end

entries={}
function process_entries()
   local processed={}
   for i,v in pairs(entries) do
      processed[i]=v --placeholder processing code
   end
   return table.unpack(processed) --returns all entries in a way that can be used as a vararg
end

print(process_entries()) --the print function takes all varargs and writes them to stdout separated by newlines

=== Pascal ===
Pascal is standardized by ISO standards 7185 (“Standard Pascal”) and 10206 (“Extended Pascal”). Neither standardized form of Pascal supports variadic routines, except for certain built-in routines (read/readLn and write/writeLn, and additionally in EP readStr/writeStr).

Nonetheless, dialects of Pascal implement mechanisms resembling variadic routines. Delphi defines an array of const data type that may be associated with the last formal parameter. Within the routine definition the array of const is an array of TVarRec, an array of variant records. The VType member of the aforementioned record data type allows inspection of the argument’s data type and subsequent appropriate handling. The Free Pascal Compiler supports Delphi’s variadic routines, too.

This implementation, however, technically requires a single argument, that is an array. Pascal imposes the restriction that arrays need to be homogenous. This requirement is circumvented by utilizing a variant record. The GNU Pascal defines a real variadic formal parameter specification using an ellipsis (...), but as of 2022 no portable mechanism to use such has been defined.

Both GNU Pascal and FreePascal allow externally declared functions to use a variadic formal parameter specification using an ellipsis (...).

=== PHP ===
PHP does not care about types of variadic arguments unless the argument is typed.

function sum(...$nums): int
{
    return array_sum($nums);
}

echo sum(1, 2, 3); // 6

And typed variadic arguments:

function sum(int ...$nums): int
{
    return array_sum($nums);
}

echo sum(1, "a", 3); // TypeError: Argument 2 passed to sum() must be of the type int (since PHP 7.3)

=== Python ===
Python does not care about types of variadic arguments.

from typing import Any

def foo(a: Any, b: Any, *args: *tuple[Any, ...]) -> None:
    print(args) # args is a tuple (immutable sequence).

if __name__ == "__main__":
    foo(1, 2) # args = ()
    foo(1, 2, 3) # args = (3,)
    foo(1, 2, 3, "hello") # args = (3, "hello")

Keyword arguments can be stored in a dictionary.

from typing import Any, Unpack

def bar(*args: *tuple[Any, ...], **kwargs: Unpack[dict[str, Any]]) -> Any:
    # function body

Note that even though args has type *tuple[Any, ...], *args is sometimes annotated with typing.Any .

=== Raku ===
In Raku, the type of parameters that create variadic functions are known as slurpy array parameters and they're classified into three groups:

==== Flattened slurpy ====
These parameters are declared with a single asterisk (*) and they flatten arguments by dissolving one or more layers of elements that can be iterated over (i.e, Iterables).

sub foo($a, $b, *@args) {
    say @args.perl;
}

foo(1, 2)                  # []
foo(1, 2, 3)               # [3]
foo(1, 2, 3, "hello")      # [3 "hello"]
foo(1, 2, 3, [4, 5], [6]); # [3, 4, 5, 6]

==== Unflattened slurpy ====
These parameters are declared with two asterisks (**) and they do not flatten any iterable arguments within the list, but keep the arguments more or less as-is:

sub bar($a, $b, **@args) {
    say @args.perl;
}

bar(1, 2);                 # []
bar(1, 2, 3);              # [3]
bar(1, 2, 3, "hello");     # [3 "hello"]
bar(1, 2, 3, [4, 5], [6]); # [3, [4, 5], [6]]

==== Contextual slurpy ====
These parameters are declared with a plus (+) sign and they apply the "single argument rule", which decides how to handle the slurpy argument based upon context. Simply put, if only a single argument is passed and that argument is iterable, that argument is used to fill the slurpy parameter array. In any other case, +@ works like **@ (i.e., unflattened slurpy).

sub zaz($a, $b, +@args) {
    say @args.perl;
}

zaz(1, 2);                 # []
zaz(1, 2, 3);              # [3]
zaz(1, 2, 3, "hello");     # [3 "hello"]
zaz(1, 2, [4, 5]);         # [4, 5], single argument fills up array
zaz(1, 2, 3, [4, 5]);      # [3, [4, 5]], behaving as **@
zaz(1, 2, 3, [4, 5], [6]); # [3, [4, 5], [6]], behaving as **@

=== Ruby ===
Ruby does not care about types of variadic arguments.

def foo(*args)
  print args
end

foo(1)
# prints `[1]=> nil`

foo(1, 2)
# prints `[1, 2]=> nil`

=== Rust ===
Rust does not support variadic arguments in functions. Instead, it uses macros, which support variadic arguments. This is essentially why println! is a macro and not a function, as it takes variadic arguments to format.

macro_rules! calculate {
    // The pattern for a single `eval`
    (eval $e:expr) => {{
        {
            let val: usize = $e; // Force types to be integers
            println!("{} = {}", stringify!{$e}, val);
        }
    }};

    // Decompose multiple `eval`s recursively
    (eval $e:expr, $(eval $es:expr),+) => {{
        calculate! { eval $e }
        calculate! { $(eval $es),+ }
    }};
}

fn main() {
    calculate! {\
        eval 1 + 2,
        eval 3 + 4,
        eval (2 * 3) + 1
    }
}

Rust is able to interact with C's variadic system via a c_variadic feature switch. As with other C interfaces, the system is considered unsafe to Rust, and marked with C linkage. The variadic parameter itself is annotated with ..., and the function may be marked safe if it is guaranteed not to access its variadic arguments.

#![feature(c_variadic)]

pub unsafe extern "C" fn add(n: usize, mut args: ...) -> usize {
    let mut sum = 0;
    for _ in 0..n {
        sum += args.arg::<usize>();
    }
    sum
}

=== Scala ===
object Program {
  // Variadic methods store any additional arguments they receive in an array.
  // Consequentially, `printArgs` is actually a method with one parameter: a
  // variable-length array of `String`s.
  private def printArgs(strings: String*): Unit = {
    strings.foreach(println)
  }

  def main(args: Array[String]): Unit = {
    printArgs("hello");          // short for printArgs(["hello"])
    printArgs("hello", "world"); // short for printArgs(["hello", "world"])
  }
}

=== Swift ===
Swift cares about the type of variadic arguments, but the catch-all Any type is available.

func greet(timeOfTheDay: String, names: String...) {
    // here, names is [String]
    
    print("Looks like we have \(names.count) people")
    
    for name in names {
        print("Hello \(name), good \(timeOfTheDay)")
    }
}

greet(timeOfTheDay: "morning", names: "Joseph", "Clara", "William", "Maria")

// Output:
// Looks like we have 4 people
// Hello Joseph, good morning
// Hello Clara, good morning
// Hello William, good morning
// Hello Maria, good morning

=== Tcl ===
A Tcl procedure or lambda is variadic when its last argument is args: this will contain a list (possibly empty) of all the remaining arguments. This pattern is common in many other procedure-like methods.

proc greet {timeOfTheDay args} {
    puts "Looks like we have [llength $args] people"

    foreach name $args {
        puts "Hello $name, good $timeOfTheDay"
    }
}

greet "morning" "Joseph" "Clara" "William" "Maria"

# Output:
# Looks like we have 4 people
# Hello Joseph, good morning
# Hello Clara, good morning
# Hello William, good morning
# Hello Maria, good morning

== See also ==
- Variadic macro
- Variadic template
