= Variadic macro =

Macro taking a varying number of arguments

A variadic macro is a feature of some computer programming languages, especially the C preprocessor, whereby a macro may be declared to accept a varying number of arguments.

Variable-argument macros were introduced in 1999 in the ISO/IEC 9899:1999 (C99) revision of the C language standard, and in 2011 in ISO/IEC 14882:2011 (C++11) revision of the C++ language standard. Support for variadic macros with no arguments was added in C++20 and C23.

== C/C++ ==
=== Declaration syntax ===
The declaration syntax is similar to that of variadic functions: a sequence of three full stops "..." is used to indicate that one or more arguments must be passed. During macro expansion each occurrence of the special identifier __VA_ARGS__ in the macro replacement list is replaced by the passed arguments.

Additionally, regular macro arguments may be listed before the ..., but regular arguments may not be listed after the ....

No means is provided to access individual arguments in the variable argument list, nor to find out how many were passed. However, macros can be written to count the number of arguments that have been passed.

Both the C99 and C++11 standards require at least one argument, but since C++20 and C23 this limitation has been lifted through the __VA_OPT__ functional macro. The __VA_OPT__ macro is replaced by its argument when arguments are present, and omitted otherwise. Common compilers also permit passing zero arguments before this addition, however.

The C preprocessor rules prevent macro names in the argument of __VA_OPT__ from expanding recursively. It is possible to work around this limitation up to an arbitrary fixed number of recursive expansions, however.

=== Support ===
Several compilers support variable-argument macros when compiling C and C++ code: the GNU Compiler Collection 3.0, Clang (all versions), Visual Studio 2005, C++Builder 2006, and Oracle Solaris Studio (formerly Sun Studio) Forte Developer 6 update 2 (C++ version 5.3). GCC also supports such macros when compiling Objective-C.

Support for the __VA_OPT__ macro to support zero arguments has been added in GNU Compiler Collection 8, Clang 6, and Visual Studio 2019.

=== Example ===
If a printf-like function dbgprintf() were desired, which would take the file and line number from which it was called as arguments, the following solution applies.

Our implemented function:

void debugPrint(const char* file, int line, const char* fmt, ...);

Due to limitations of the variadic macro support in C++11 the following straightforward solution can fail and should thus be avoided:

#define dbgprintf(cformat, ...) debugPrint(__FILE__, __LINE__, cformat, __VA_ARGS__)

The reason is that

dbgprintf("Hallo")

gets expanded to

debugPrint(__FILE__, __LINE__, "Hallo", )

where the comma before the closing brace will result in a syntax error.

GNU C++ supports a non-portable extension which solves this:

#define dbgprintf(cformat, ...) debugPrint(__FILE__, __LINE__, cformat, ##__VA_ARGS__)

C++20 supports the following syntax.

#define dbgprintf(cformat, ...) debugPrint(__FILE__, __LINE__, cformat __VA_OPT__(,) __VA_ARGS__)

By using the cformat string as part of the variadic arguments we can circumvent the abovementioned incompatibilities. This is tricky but portable.

#define dbgprintf(...) debugPrint(__FILE__, __LINE__, __VA_ARGS__)

dbgprintf() could then be called as

dbgprintf("Hello, world");

which expands to

debugPrint(__FILE__, __LINE__, "Hello, world");

Another example is:

dbgprintf("%d + %d = %d", 2, 2, 5);

which expands to

debugPrint(__FILE__, __LINE__, "%d + %d = %d", 2, 2, 5);

Without variadic macros, writing wrappers to printf is not directly possible. The standard workaround is to use the stdargs functionality of C/C++, and have the function call vprintf instead.

=== Trailing comma ===
There is a portability issue with generating a trailing comma with empty args for variadic macros in C99. Some compilers (e.g., Visual Studio when not using the new standard-conformant preprocessor) will silently eliminate the trailing comma. Other compilers (e.g.: GCC) support putting ## in front of __VA_ARGS__.

#define MYLOG(FormatLiteral, ...)  fprintf(stderr, "%s(%u): " FormatLiteral "\n", __FILE__, __LINE__, __VA_ARGS__)

The following application works

MYLOG("Too many balloons %u", 42);

which expands to

fprintf(stderr, "%s(%u): " "Too many balloons %u" "\n", __FILE__, __LINE__, 42);

which is equivalent to

fprintf(stderr, "%s(%u): Too many balloons %u\n", __FILE__, __LINE__, 42);

But look at this application:

MYLOG("Attention!");

which expands to

fprintf(stderr, "%s(%u): " "Attention!" "\n", __FILE__, __LINE__, );

which generates a syntax error with GCC.

GCC supports the following (non-portable) extension:

#define MYLOG(FormatLiteral, ...)  fprintf(stderr, "%s(%u): " FormatLiteral "\n", __FILE__, __LINE__, ##__VA_ARGS__)

which removes the trailing comma when __VA_ARGS__ is empty.

C23 solves this problem by introducing __VA_OPT__ like C++.

=== Alternatives ===
Before the existence of variable-arguments in C99, it was quite common to use doubly nested parentheses to exploit the variable number of arguments that could be supplied to the printf() function:

#define dbgprintf(x) debugPrint x

dbgprintf() could then be called as:

dbgprintf(("Hello, world %d", 27));

which expands to:

debugPrint("Hello, world %d", 27);

== Rust ==
In Rust, a variadic interface (also known as a variadic macro), allows for taking an arbitrary number of arguments. Rust lacks variadic functions and variadic templates, thus the only way variadic parameters can be accomplished is through said variadic interfaces, which use repetition patterns through macro_rules!. For example, in $( ... ),*, $() denotes a repeating pattern, , denotes a separator, * denotes zero or more repetitions (a Kleene star, while + which matches one or more would be a Kleene plus).

One such example of implementing a variadic macro is the following, equivalent to vec!:

// Define a macro named "make_vec!"
macro_rules! make_vec {
    // Matches any Rust expression
    // and repeat the pattern separated by commas, zero or more times
    ( $( $x:expr ),* ) => {
        {
            // Vec must be fully qualified
            // to prevent resolving to a user-defined Vec
            let mut temp = ::std::vec::Vec::new();
            // Repeat a push to temp once per argument
            $(
                temp.push($x);
            )*
            // Return temp from the macro
            temp
        }
    };
}

== See also ==
- Variadic function
- Variadic template
