= Carbon (programming language) =

Programming language designed for interoperability with C++

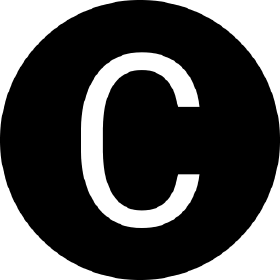
- Logo on Carbon's GitHub organization
- Family: C
- Designed by: Google
- Typing discipline: Static, nominative, partly inferred
- Implementation language: C++
- License: Apache with LLVM exception
- Filename extensions: .carbon
- Website: github.com/carbon-language

Influenced by
- C++, Rust, Zig, Haskell, Kotlin, Swift

Carbon is an experimental programming language intended to be a successor to C++. Carbon seeks to provide modern language features and reformed syntax while being compatible with existing C++ code. The project is from Google, and is open-source.

Google's engineer Chandler Carruth first introduced Carbon at the CppNorth conference in Toronto in July 2022. He stated that Carbon was created to be a C++ successor. The language is expected to have an experimental minimum viable product (MVP) version 0.1 in late 2026 at the earliest and a production-ready version 1.0 after 2028.

The language intends to fix several perceived shortcomings of C++ but otherwise provides a similar feature set. The main goals of the language are readability and "bi-directional interoperability" (which allows the user to include C++ code in the Carbon file), as opposed to using a new language like Rust, that, while being influenced by C++, is not two-way compatible with C++ programs. Changes to the language will be decided by the Carbon leads. It aims to build on the C++ ecosystem the way in an analogous role to TypeScript on JavaScript, or Kotlin on Java.

Carbon's documents, design, implementation, and related tools are hosted on GitHub under the Apache 2.0 license with LLVM Exceptions.

== Example ==
The following shows how a program might be written in Carbon, compared with its equivalent in C++:

Carbon

package Geometry;

import Math;

class Circle {
    var radius: f32;
}

fn PrintTotalArea(circles: [Circle]) {
    var area: f32 = 0;
    for (circ: Circle in circles) {
        area += Math.Pi * circ.radius * circ.radius;
    }
    Print("Total area: {0}", area);
}

fn Run() -> i32 {
    // A dynamically sized array, like `std::vector`.
    var circles: array [Circle] = ({.radius = 1.0}, {.radius = 2.0});
    // Implicitly constructs a slice from the array.
    PrintTotalArea(circles);
    return 0;
}

C++

import std;

using std::span;
using std::vector;

struct Circle {
    float radius;
};

void printTotalArea(span<Circle> circles) {
    float area = 0.0f;
    for (const Circle& circ : circles) {
        area += std::numbers::pi * circ.radius * circ.radius;
    }
    std::println("Total area: {}", area);
}

int main(int argc, char* argv[]) {
    vector<Circle> circles{{.radius = 1.0f}, {.radius = 2.0f}};
    // Implicitly converts `vector` to `span`.

    printTotalArea(circles);
    return 0;
}

== See also ==
- Comparison of programming languages
- Timeline of programming languages
- C++ syntax
