= Tiobe =

Tiobe or TIOBE may refer to:

- The Importance of Being Earnest, a comic play by Oscar Wilde
- TIOBE index, a programming language popularity index
