= Sizeof =

Storage size operator in C and C++

sizeof is a unary operator in the C and C++ programming languages that evaluates to the storage size of an expression or a data type, measured in units sized as char. Consequently, the expression sizeof(char) evaluates to 1. The number of bits of type char is specified by the preprocessor macro CHAR_BIT, defined in the standard include file <limits.h>. On most modern computing platforms this is eight bits. The result of sizeof is an unsigned integer that is usually typed as size_t.

The operator accepts a single operand which is either a data type expressed as a cast – the name of a data type enclosed in parentheses – or a non-type expression for which parentheses are not required.

== Purpose ==
Many programs must know the storage size of a particular datatype. Though for any given implementation of C or C++ the size of a particular datatype is constant, the sizes of even primitive types in C and C++ may be defined differently for different platforms of implementation. For example, runtime allocation of array space may use the following code, in which the sizeof operator is applied to the cast of the type int:

int* pointer = (int*)malloc(10 * sizeof(int));

In this example, the malloc() function allocates memory and returns a pointer to the memory block. The size of the block allocated is equal to the number of bytes for a single object of type int multiplied by 10, providing space for ten integers.

It is generally not safe to assume the size of any datatype. For example, even though most implementations of C and C++ on 32-bit systems define type int to be four octets, this size may change when code is ported to a different system, breaking the code. The exception to this is the data type char, which always has the size 1 in any standards-compliant C implementation. In addition, it is frequently difficult to predict the sizes of compound datatypes such as a struct or union, due to padding. The use of sizeof enhances readability, since it avoids unnamed numeric constants (magic numbers).

An equivalent syntax for allocating the same array space results from using the dereferenced form of the pointer to the storage address, this time applying the operator to a pointer variable:

int* pointer =  (int*)malloc(10 * sizeof *pointer);

== Use ==
The operator sizeof produces the required memory storage space of its operand when the code is compiled. The operand is written following the keyword sizeof and may be the symbol of a storage space, e.g., a variable, an expression, or a type name. Parentheses for the operand are optional, except when specifying a type name. The result of the operator is the size of the operand in bytes, or the size of the memory storage requirement. For expressions, it evaluates to the representation size for the type that would result from evaluation of the expression, which is not performed.

For example, since sizeof(char) is defined to be 1 and assuming the integer type is four bytes long, the following code fragment prints 1,4:

char c;
printf("%zu,%zu\n", sizeof c, sizeof(int));

Certain standard header files, such as <stddef.h>, define size_t to denote the unsigned integral type of the result of a sizeof expression. The printf() width specifier z is intended to format that type.

sizeof cannot be used in C preprocessor expressions, such as #if, because it is an element of the programming language, not of the preprocessor syntax or its macros, which have no data types.

The following example in C++ uses the operator sizeof with variadic templates.

template <typename... Args>
[[nodiscard]]
size_t getSize(Args&&... args) noexcept {
    // Get size of parameter pack.
    size_t count = sizeof...(Args);
    return count;           
}

sizeof can be used with variadic templates in C++11 and above on a parameter pack to determine the number of arguments.

=== Application to arrays ===
When sizeof is applied to the name of an array, the result is the number of bytes required to store the entire array. This is one of the few exceptions to the rule that the name of an array is converted to a pointer to the first element of the array, and is possible just because the actual array size is fixed and known at compile time, when the sizeof operator is evaluated. The following program uses sizeof to determine the size of a declared array, avoiding a buffer overflow when copying characters:

#include <stdio.h>

int main(int argc, char* argv[]) {
    // Array of 10 chars
    char buffer[10];

    /* Copy at most 9 characters from argv[1] into buffer,
     * null-terminate the buffer. 
     */
    snprintf(buffer, sizeof buffer, "%s", argv[1]);

    return 0;
}

Here, sizeof buffer is equivalent to 10 * sizeof buffer[0], which evaluates to 10, because the size of the type char is defined as 1.

C99 adds support for flexible array members to structures. This form of array declaration is allowed as the last element in structures only, and differs from normal arrays in that no length is specified to the compiler. For a structure named s containing a flexible array member named a, sizeof s is therefore equivalent to offsetof(s, a):

#include <stdio.h>

typedef struct {
    char val;
    int a[];  
    // Flexible array member; must be last element of struct
} FlexibleArray;

int main(int argc, char* argv[]) {
    printf("sizeof(FlexibleArray) == %zu\n", sizeof(FlexibleArray));
    return 0;
}

In this case the sizeof operator returns the size of the structure, including any padding, but without any storage allowed for the array. Most platforms produce the following output:

sizeof(FlexibleArray) == 4

C99 also allows variable length arrays that have the length specified at runtime, although the feature is considered an optional implementation in later versions of the C standard. In such cases, the sizeof operator is evaluated in part at runtime to determine the storage occupied by the array.

#include <stddef.h>

size_t flexsize(int n) {
    char b[n + 3]; // Variable length array
    return sizeof b; // Execution time sizeof
}

int main(void) {
    size_t size = flexsize(10); // flexsize returns 13
    return 0;
}

sizeof can be used to determine the number of elements in an array, by dividing the size of the entire array by the size of a single element. This should be used with caution; When passing an array to another function, it will "decay" to a pointer type. At this point, sizeof will return the size of the pointer, not the total size of the array. As an example with a proper array:

int main(void) {
    int tab[10];
    printf("Number of elements in the array: %zu\n", sizeof tab / sizeof tab[0]); // yields 10 
    return 0;
}

=== Incomplete types ===
sizeof can only be applied to "completely" defined types. With arrays, this means that the dimensions of the array must be present in its declaration, and that the type of the elements must be completely defined. For structs and unions, this means that there must be a member list of completely defined types. For example, consider the following two source files:

// File1.c
int arr[10];

struct IntegerPair {
    int first; 
    int second;
};
// more code...

// File2.c
extern int arr[];
struct IntegerPair;

// more code...

Both files are perfectly legal C, and code in File1.c can apply sizeof to arr and struct IntegerPair. However, it is illegal for code in File2.c to do this, because the definitions in File2.c are not complete. In the case of arr, the code does not specify the dimension of the array; without this information, the compiler has no way of knowing how many elements are in the array, and cannot calculate the array's overall size. Likewise, the compiler cannot calculate the size of struct IntegerPair because it does not know what members it is made up of, and therefore cannot calculate the sum of the sizes of the structure's members (and padding). If the programmer provided the size of the array in its declaration in File2.c, or completed the definition of struct IntegerPair by supplying a member list, this would allow the application of sizeof to arr or struct IntegerPair in that source file.

=== Object members ===
C++11 introduced the possibility to apply the sizeof parameter to specific members of a class without the necessity to instantiate the object to achieve this. The following example for instance yields 4 and 8 on most platforms.

import std;

struct IntegerPair {
    int first;
    int second;
};

int main() {
    std::println("{}, {}", sizeof(IntegerPair::first), sizeof(IntegerPair));
}

=== Variadic template packs ===
C++11 introduced variadic templates; the keyword sizeof followed by ellipsis returns the number of elements in a parameter pack.

template <typename... Args>
void printSize(Args... args) {
    std::println("{}", sizeof...(args));
}

int main() {
    printSize(); // outputs 0
    printSize("Is the answer", 42, true); // outputs 3
}

== Implementation ==
When applied to a fixed-length datatype or variable, expressions with the operator sizeof are evaluated during program compilation; they are replaced by constant result-values. The C99 standard introduced variable-length arrays (VLAs), which required evaluation for such expressions during program execution. In many cases, the implementation specifics may be documented in an application binary interface (ABI) document for the platform, specifying formats, padding, and alignment for the data types, to which the compiler must conform.

=== Structure padding ===
When calculating the size of any object type, the compiler must take into account any required data structure alignment to meet efficiency or architectural constraints. Many computer architectures do not support multiple-byte access starting at any byte address that is not a multiple of the word size, and even when the architecture allows it, usually the processor can fetch a word-aligned object faster than it can fetch an object that straddles multiple words in memory. Therefore, compilers usually align data structures to at least a word boundary, and also align individual members to their respective boundaries. In the following example, the structure Student is likely to be aligned on a word boundary, which is also where the member grade begins, and the member age is likely to start at the next word address. The compiler accomplishes the latter by inserting padding bytes between members as needed to satisfy the alignment requirements. There may also be padding at the end of a structure to ensure proper alignment in case the structure is used as an element of an array.

Thus, the aggregate size of a structure in C can be greater than the sum of the sizes of its individual members. For example, on many systems the following code prints 8:

struct Student {
    char grade; // char is 1 byte long
    int age; // int is 4 bytes long
};

printf("%zu", sizeof(struct Student));

== See also ==
- typeof
- offsetof
