= Richard Wexelblat =

American computer scientist

Richard L. Wexelblat, also known as Dick Wexelblat, is an American former artisan woodturner and former computer scientist.

== Early life ==
Wexelblat received his BSEE, MSEE (CS), and Ph.D. (CS) from The Moore School of Electrical Engineering at the University of Pennsylvania in June 1959, June 1961, and December 1965 respectively. His doctorate is believed by many and so reported by the Association for Computing Machinery to have been the first ever awarded by a formally recognized computer science department. (Note: Not the first computer science doctorate, but the first awarded by a computer science department.) His doctoral advisor was Noah Prywes.

He left the computer field to become an artisan woodturner and has since retired from that field as well. He currently resides with his wife at a seniors' facility in Coatesville, Pennsylvania.

== Career ==
He is said to be the originator of Wexelblat's scheduling algorithm summarized as "choose two of: good, fast, cheap." He states, "Bob Rosin said I originated this; I'm not sure. He also credited me with having been the first to refer to Occam's razor as 'The Law of Least Astonishment'".

== Personal life ==
His sons, Alan and David and his brother Paul are also computer scientists, although Paul is now mostly retired and David is now a lawyer. Paul wrote code for the Interface Message Processor packet switching node, part of the earliest version of the internet making him an internet pioneer.

Andries van Dam completed his Ph.D. in computer science at the Moore School only a few weeks after Richard. Andy has devoted his professional life to computer science and computer graphics.

== Selected publications ==
- Richard L. Wexelblat (ed.): History of Programming Languages, Academic Press 1981. ISBN 978-0-12-745040-7
