= Complex data type =

Some programming languages provide a complex data type for complex number storage and arithmetic as a built-in (primitive) data type.

== Complex-number arithmetic ==
A complex variable or value is usually represented as a pair of floating-point numbers. Languages that support a complex data type usually provide special syntax for building such values, and extend the basic arithmetic operations ('+', '−', '×', '÷') to act on them. These operations are usually translated by the compiler into a sequence of floating-point machine instructions or into library calls. Those languages may also provide support for other operations, such as formatting, equality testing, etc. As in mathematics, those languages often interpret a floating-point value as equivalent to a complex value with a zero imaginary part.

== Language support ==
- The FORTRAN COMPLEX type.
- The C99 standard of the C programming language includes complex data types and complex-math functions in the standard library header <complex.h>.
- The C++ standard library provides a complex template class as well as complex-math functions in the <complex> header.
- The Go programming language has built-in types complex64 (each component is 32-bit float) and complex128 (each component is 64-bit float). Imaginary number literals can be specified by appending an "i".
- The Perl core module Math::Complex provides support for complex numbers.
- Python provides the built-in complex type. Imaginary number literals can be specified by appending a "j". Complex-math functions are provided in the standard library module cmath.
- Ruby provides a Complex class in the standard library module complex.
- OCaml supports complex numbers with the standard library module Complex.
- Haskell supports complex numbers with the standard library module Data.Complex (previously called Complex).
- Mercury provides complex numbers with full operator overloading support in the extras distribution, using libcomplex_numbers.
- Java does not have a standard complex number class, but there exist a number of incompatible free implementations of a complex number class:
  - The Apache Commons Math library provides complex numbers for Java with its Complex class.
  - The JScience library has a Complex number class.
  - The JAS library allows the use of complex numbers.
  - Netlib has a complex number class for Java.
  - javafastcomplex also adds complex number support for Java.
  - jcomplexnumber is a project on implementation of complex number in Java.
  - JLinAlg includes complex numbers with arbitrary precision.
- Common Lisp: The ANSI Common Lisp standard supports complex numbers of floats, rationals and arbitrary precision integers. Its basic mathematical functions are defined for complex numbers, where applicable. For example the square root of −1 is a complex number:

 ? (sqrt -1)
# C(0 1)            ; the result of (sqrt -1)

- Scheme: Complex numbers and functions (e.g. sin) are included in the language specification. Their implementation is however optional in the R5RS standard, while in R6RS is mandatory.
- The .NET Framework provides System.Numerics.Complex since version 4.0.
- The smart BASIC for iOS naturally supports complex numbers in notation a + bi. Any variable, math operation or function can accept both real and complex numbers as arguments and return real or complex numbers depending on result. For example the square root of −4 is a complex number:
  PRINT SQRT(-4)
2i
- Julia includes predefined types for both complex and rational numbers since at least version 0.3.
- R provides a complex basic data type.
- Rust does not provide a built-in complex data type, but multiple crates, that add support for such types, exist.
- Swift does not have a standard complex number data type, but Swift Numerics which is maintained by the language maintainers offers ComplexModule.
