= TIOBE index =

Measure of popularity of programming languages

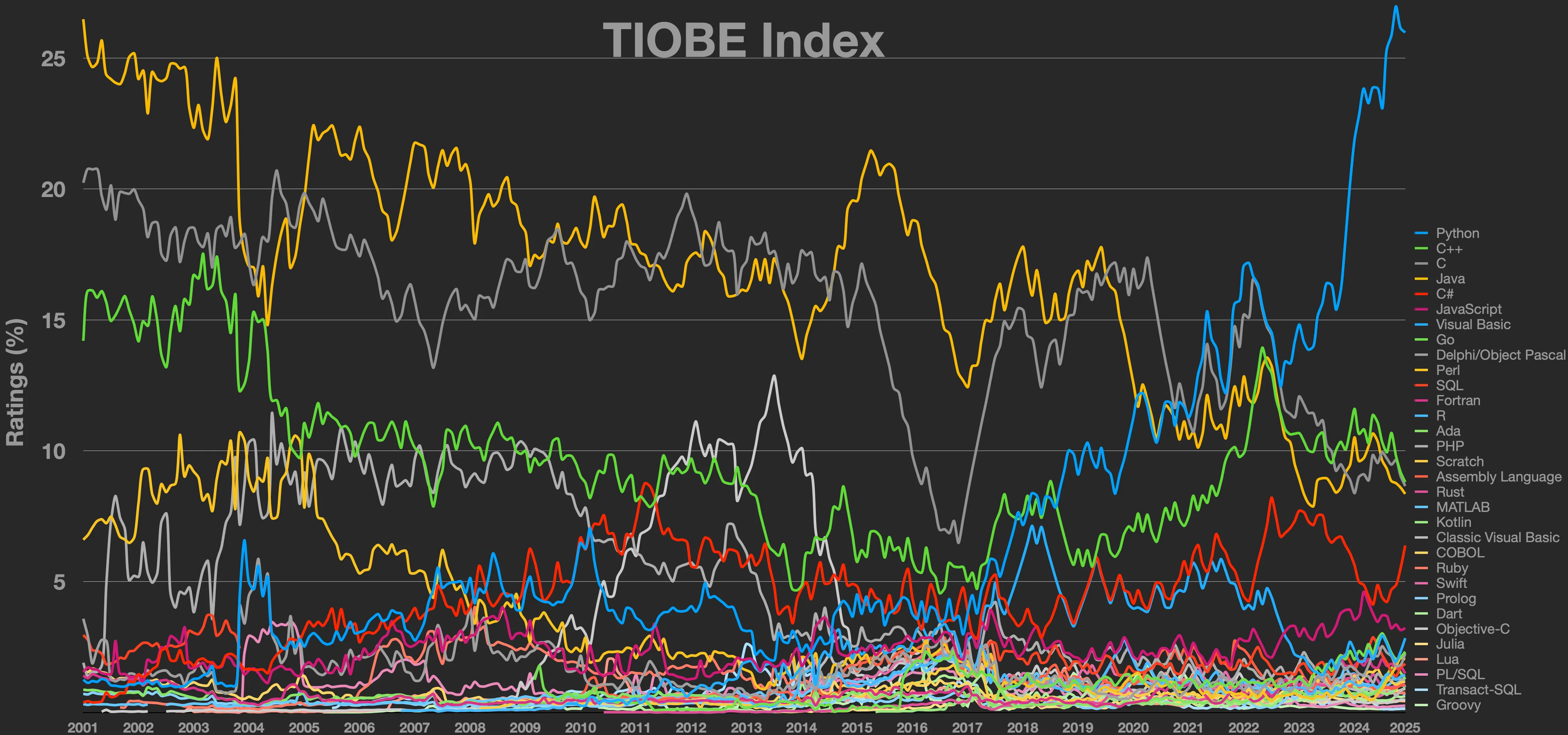
TIOBE index

The TIOBE programming community index is a measure of popularity of programming languages, created and maintained by TIOBE Software BV, based in Eindhoven, the Netherlands. TIOBE stands for The Importance of Being Earnest, the title of an 1895 comedy play by Oscar Wilde, to emphasize the organization's "sincere and professional attitude towards customers, suppliers and colleagues".

The index is calculated from the number of search engine results for queries containing the name of the language. The index covers searches in Google, Google Blogs, MSN, Yahoo!, Baidu, Wikipedia, and YouTube. The index is updated once a month. The current information is free, but the long-term statistical data is for sale. The index authors have stated that it may be valuable when making various strategic decisions. TIOBE focuses on Turing-complete programming languages and provides no information on the popularity of markup languages, such as HTML or XML.

== History ==
TIOBE index is sensitive to the ranking policy of the search engines on which it is based. For example, in April 2004, Google performed a cleanup action to get rid of unfair attempts to promote the search rank of many websites. As a consequence, there was a large drop for several languages, such as C++ and JavaScript, yet those languages have stayed at the top of the index. To avoid such fluctuations, TIOBE now uses multiple search engines.

In August 2016, C reached its lowest ratings score since the index was launched, but was still the second most popular language after Java, while in May 2020, C regained the top, and since then Java has substantially gone down in popularity while still maintaining number-two position until November 2020, when Python overtook Java, taking the number-two position. In 2021, Java regained its number-two position, and in 2022, Python overtook both Java and C to become the most popular programming language.

The TIOBE programming language of the year award goes to the language with the biggest annual popularity gain in the index, e.g., Go won it in 2016, and Python won it in 2020.

== Criticisms ==
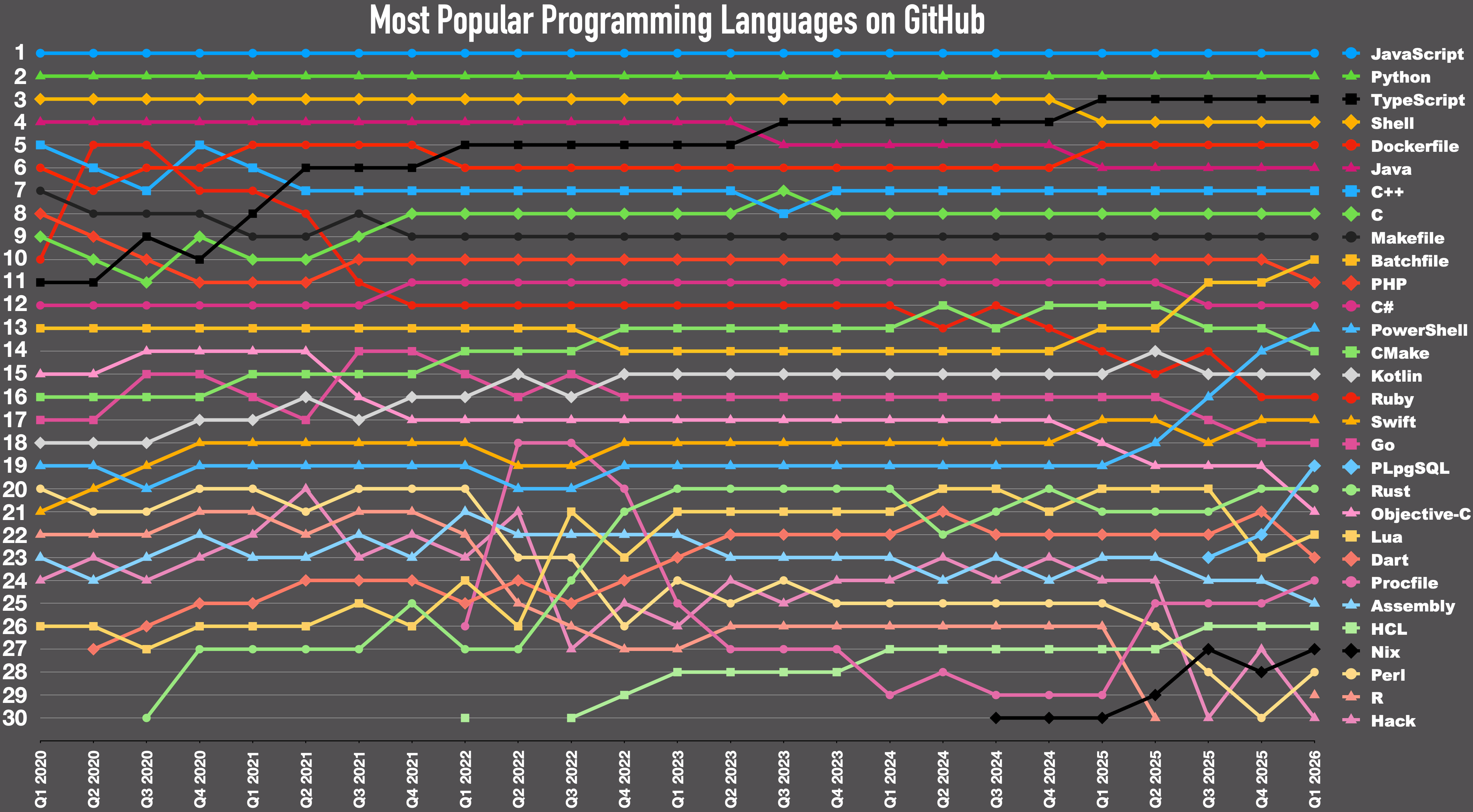
Most popular programming languages on GitHub

Maintainers specify that the TIOBE index is "not about the best programming language or the language in which most lines of code have been written", but do claim that the number of web pages may reflect the number of skilled engineers, courses and jobs worldwide.

In 2012, TIOBE's naming of Objective-C as the "programming language of the year" was challenged, with noted critics advocating for Microsoft's C#. Tim Bunce, author of the Perl DBI, has been critical of the index and its methods of ranking.
