= Franklin H. Westervelt =

American computer scientist

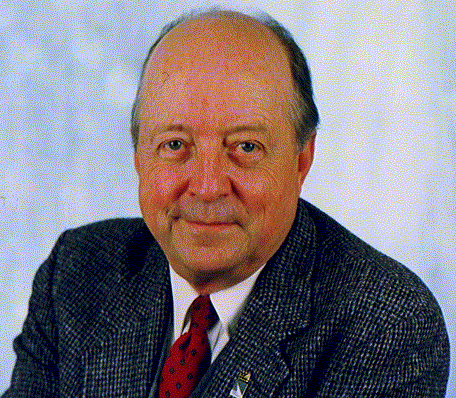
Frank Westerveldt

Franklin Herbert Westervelt (March 26, 1930 – July 29, 2015) was an American engineer, computer scientist, and educator at the University of Michigan and Wayne State University. Westervelt received degrees in Mathematics, Mechanical and Electrical Engineering from the College of Engineering at the University of Michigan. He attained his PhD in 1961. He was a Professor of Mechanical Engineering at the University of Michigan and an Associate Director at the U-M Computing Center. He was involved in early studies on how to use computers in engineering education.

== Biography ==
He was born in Benton Harbor, Michigan on March 26, 1930 to Herbert Oleander Westervelt and Dorothy Ulbright.

From 1965 to 1970 he was Project Director for the ARPA sponsored CONCOMP (Research in Conversational Use of Computers) Project. He was involved in the design of the architecture and negotiations with IBM over the virtual memory features that would be included in what became the IBM S/360 Model 67 computer. When IBM's TSS/360 time-sharing operating system for the S/360-67 was not available, the CONCOMP project supported the initial development of Michigan Terminal System (MTS) in cooperation with the staff of the University of Michigan Computing Center. This included David L. Mills development of the original PDP-8 Data Concentrator with its interface to an IBM S/360 Input/Output channel, the first such interface to be built outside of IBM. CONCOMP also developed the integration for the IBM 7772 based Audio Response Unit (ARU) as an MTS I/O device, the MAD/I compiler, mini-computer based graphics terminals, and the Set-Theoretic Data Structure model that was later used in ILIR:MICRO.

ARPANET program manager Larry Roberts asked Frank to explore the questions of message size and contents for the ARPANET, and to write a position paper on the intercomputer communication protocol including “conventions for character and block transmission, error checking and re transmission, and computer and user identification." Frank also served as a representative to the statewide Michigan Inter-university Committee on Information Systems (MICIS) and was involved in establishing the MERIT Computer Network.

Fred Gibbons, a successful entrepreneur and venture capitalist, said that the University of Michigan College of Engineering, where he earned his BSE and MSE degrees in the late 1960s and early 1970s when computers were unknown or a novelty in most classrooms and the school didn’t even offer a formal computer major, "... was at the forefront of technology that turned out to be very important to me personally, and I got early exposure to it from a couple of great guys–professors Frank Westervelt and Bernard Galler."

U-M Vice President for Research Geoffrey Norman, writing in 1976, gave special credit to the triumvirate of Michigan computer specialists who contributed greatly to the future of computing at Michigan and in the nation as a whole. "Bartels, Arden, and Westervelt," Norman has said, "were a team that we took great care should not be broken up or induced to leave the University. Westervelt, the hardware expert, Arden, brilliant in software and logic, and Bartels orchestrating their progress-these three put together a superb timesharing computer system. The University and their faculty colleagues owe them much."

Frank Westervelt served Wayne State University from 1971 to 1982 as Director of the Computing Service Center, from 1982 to 2000 as professor in the Department of Electrical and Computer Engineering where he was Associate Chair and Undergraduate Officer from 1990 to 1994 and Chair from 1995 to 2000. He started interactive distance learning within ECE organizing, designing, and developing electronics classrooms and writing software to ease development of electronic presentations. He obtained the contract to develop and deliver the first ECE Course (ECE 562) to ECCE Master’s Program students at Ford Motor Company by Distance Learning methods. In honor of his services Ford Motor Company presented him with the 1993 Customer driven Quality Award as a Member of Ford/Wayne State University Interactive Distance Education Program Team, the only award given by Ford to a university faculty member in 1993.

Frank died on July 29, 2015 (aged 85) at his home in Ann Arbor, Michigan.
