= UMES (disambiguation) =

UMES can refer to:

- University of Maryland Eastern Shore - in Princess Anne, Maryland, is part of the University System of Maryland.
- University of Michigan Executive System - a operating system.
