= Robert M. Graham (computer scientist) =

American computer scientist (1929–2020)

Robert Montrose Graham (1929 in Michigan, US – January 2, 2020) was a cybersecurity researcher computer scientist and Professor Emeritus of Computer Science at the University of Massachusetts Amherst. He was born to a Scottish emigrant.

He received his undergraduate and graduate degrees from the University of Michigan. While working at the UofM's Computing Center he co-authored two compilers, GAT for the IBM 650 and MAD for the IBM 704/709/7090.

In 1963 he moved to MIT to participate in the development of Multics, one of the first virtual memory time-sharing computer operating systems. He had responsibility for protection, dynamic linking, and other key system kernel areas.

Later worked at University of California, Berkeley, City College of New York, and the University of Massachusetts Amherst. Officially retired in 1996, but continued to teach until the end of 2003.

In 1996 he was inducted as a Fellow of the Association for Computing Machinery.

He is the author of numerous books and professional articles.
