= Bruce Arden =

American computer scientist (1927–2021)

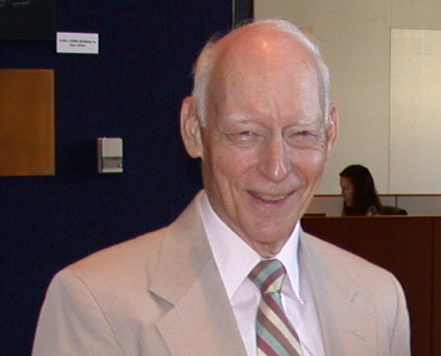
- Bruce Arden, September 10, 2004
- Born: Bruce Wesley Arden; May 29, 1927
- Died: December 8, 2021 (aged 94)
- Education: Purdue University
- Occupation: Computer scientist

Bruce Wesley Arden (May 29, 1927 – December 8, 2021) was an American computer scientist.

Arden enlisted in the U.S. Navy during World War II (1944-1946), serving as a Radar Technician Third Class in California, Chicago, and Kodiak, Alaska.

He graduated from Purdue University with a BS(EE) in 1949 and started his computing career in 1950 with the wiring and programming of IBM's hybrid (mechanical and electronic) Card Programmed Computer/Calculator at the Allison Division of General Motors. Next he spent a short period as a programmer for computations being done at the University of Michigan's Willow Run Laboratory using the Standards Eastern Automatic Computer.

He then became a research associate at the University of Michigan's Statistical Research Laboratory and later an associate director of the university's Computing Center after its establishment in 1959. While at Michigan he co-authored two compilers, GAT for the IBM 650 and MAD for the IBM 704/709/7090, was involved in the design of the architecture and negotiations with IBM over the virtual memory features that would be included in what became the IBM System/360 Model 67 computer, and in the initial design of the Michigan Terminal System (MTS) time-sharing operating system.

U-M Vice President for Research Geoffrey Norman, writing in 1976, gave special credit to a triumvirate of Michigan computer specialists who contributed greatly to the future of computing at Michigan and in the nation as a whole. "Bartels, Arden, and Westervelt," Norman has said, "were a team that we took great care should not be broken up or induced to leave the University. Westervelt, the hardware expert, Arden, brilliant in software and logic, and Bartels orchestrating their progress-these three put together a superb timesharing computer system. The university and their faculty colleagues owe them much."

Arden's increasing interest in academic computer science and engineering motivated him to complete a doctoral program in electrical engineering in 1965. He was subsequently a professor in, and ultimately chairman of, the Computer and Communication Sciences department at Michigan. In 1973 he accepted a professorship at Princeton University and chaired the department of Electrical Engineering and Computer Science. In 1986, then Princeton's Alexander Doty Professor of Engineering, he went to the University of Rochester as its dean of the College of Engineering and Applied Science. In the three years preceding the addition of "Emeritus" to his academic title (William May Professor of Engineering) in 1995, he also served as Rochester's vice provost for telecommunications and computing.

During his academic career, Arden wrote two books on numerical computation and edited another on computer science and engineering research. He wrote many papers in the areas of compilers, operating systems, computer logic and networks. In addition, he supervised many students, both undergraduate and graduate, in their studies of the various aspects of computing, and he served as a consultant to government agencies and several major computer companies at various times during those years.

He retired in 1995 and lived in Michigan and Maine.
