= University of Michigan Executive System =

University of Michigan Executive System (UMES)
- Developer: University of Michigan
- Written in: Assembly language
- Working state: Discontinued
- Initial release: 1958; 67 years ago
- Available in: English
- Platforms: IBM 704, IBM 709, IBM 7090
- Preceded by: GM-NAA I/O
- Succeeded by: Michigan Terminal System

The University of Michigan Executive System, or UMES, a batch operating system developed at the University of Michigan in 1958, was widely used at many universities. Based on the General Motors Executive System for the IBM 701, UMES was revised to work on the mainframe computers in use at the University of Michigan during this time (IBM 704, 709, and 7090) and to work better for the small student jobs that were expected to be the primary work load at the university.

UMES was in use at the University of Michigan until 1967, when MTS was phased in to take advantage of the newer virtual memory time-sharing technology that became available on the IBM System/360 Model 67.

== Programming languages available ==
- FORTRAN
- MAD (programming language)

== See also ==
- Timeline of operating systems
- History of IBM mainframe operating systems
- FORTRAN Monitor System
- Bell Operating System (BESYS) or Bell Monitor (BELLMON)
- SHARE Operating System (SOS)
- IBM 7090/94 IBSYS
- Compatible Time-Sharing System (CTSS)
- Michigan Terminal System (MTS)
- Hardware: IBM 701, IBM 704, IBM 709, IBM 7090
