= MAD (programming language) =

Historical programming language

- Paradigm: procedural, imperative, structured
- Family: ALGOL
- Designed by: Bernard Galler, Bruce Arden, Robert M. Graham
- Developer: University of Michigan
- First appeared: 1959; 66 years ago
- Typing discipline: Static, strong
- Scope: Lexical
- OS: UMES, MTS, CTSS, others

Major implementations
- IBM 704, 7090, S/360, S/370; UNIVAC 1108; Philco 210-211

Dialects
- MAD, MAD/I, GOM

Influenced by
- IAL, ALGOL 58

MAD (Michigan Algorithm Decoder) is a programming language and compiler for the IBM 704 and later the IBM 709, IBM 7090, IBM 7040, UNIVAC 1107, UNIVAC 1108, Philco 210-211, and eventually IBM System/370 mainframe computers. Developed in 1959 at the University of Michigan by Bernard Galler, Bruce Arden and Robert M. Graham, MAD is a variant of the ALGOL language. It was widely used to teach programming at colleges and universities during the 1960s and played a minor role in the development of Compatible Time-Sharing System (CTSS), Multics, and the Michigan Terminal System computer operating systems. The original version of the chatbot ELIZA was written in MAD-SLIP.

The archives at the Bentley Historical Library of the University of Michigan contain reference materials on the development of MAD and MAD/I, including three linear feet of printouts with hand-written notations and original printed manuals.

== MAD, MAD/I, and GOM ==
Three MAD compilers exist:

1. Original MAD, the compiler developed in 1959 at the University of Michigan for the IBM 704 and later the IBM 709 and IBM 7090 mainframe computers running the University of Michigan Executive System (UMES) and the Compatible Time-Sharing System (CTSS) operating systems. In the mid-1960s MAD was ported at the University of Maryland to the UNIVAC 1108. Versions of MAD were also available for the Philco 210-211 and UNIVAC 1107.
2. MAD/I, an "extended" version of MAD for the IBM System/360 series of computers running under the Michigan Terminal System (MTS). Work on the new compiler started in 1965 as part of the ARPA sponsored CONCOMP project at the University of Michigan. As work progressed it gradually became clear that MAD/I was a new language independent of the original 7090 version of MAD.
3. GOM (Good Old MAD), a reimplementation of the original 7090 MAD for the IBM System/370 series of mainframe computers running the Michigan Terminal System (MTS). GOM was created in the early 1980s by Don Boettner at the University of Michigan Computing Center.

== History ==
While MAD was motivated by ALGOL 58, it does not resemble ALGOL 58 in any significant way.

Programs written in MAD included MAIL, RUNOFF, one of the first text processing systems, and several other utilities all under Compatible Time-Sharing System (CTSS). Work was done on a design for a MAD compiler for Multics, but it was never implemented.

The following is an interesting quote from An Interview with Brian Kernighan when he was asked "What hooked you on programming?":

I think that the most fun I had programming was a summer job at Project MAC at MIT in the summer of 1966, where I worked on a program that created a job tape for the brand new GE 645 in the earliest days of Multics. I was writing in MAD, which was much easier and more pleasant than the FORTRAN and COBOL that I had written earlier, and I was using CTSS, the first time-sharing system, which was infinitely easier and more pleasant than punch cards.

MAD was quite fast compared to some of the other compilers of its day. Because a number of people were interested in using the FORTRAN language and yet wanted to obtain the speed of the MAD compiler, a system called MADTRAN (written in MAD) was developed. MADTRAN was simply a translator from FORTRAN to MAD, which then produced machine code. MADTRAN was distributed through SHARE.

MAD/I has a syntactic structure similar to ALGOL 60 together with important features from the original MAD and from PL/I. MAD/I was designed as an extensible language. It was available for use under MTS and provided many new ideas which made their way into other languages, but MAD/I compilations were slow and MAD/I never extended itself into widespread use when compared to the original 7090 MAD.

GOM is essentially the 7090 MAD language modified and extended for the 360/370 architecture with some judicious tailoring to better fit current programming practices and problems. The MTS Message System was written in GOM.

== MAD, Mad magazine, and Alfred E. Neuman ==
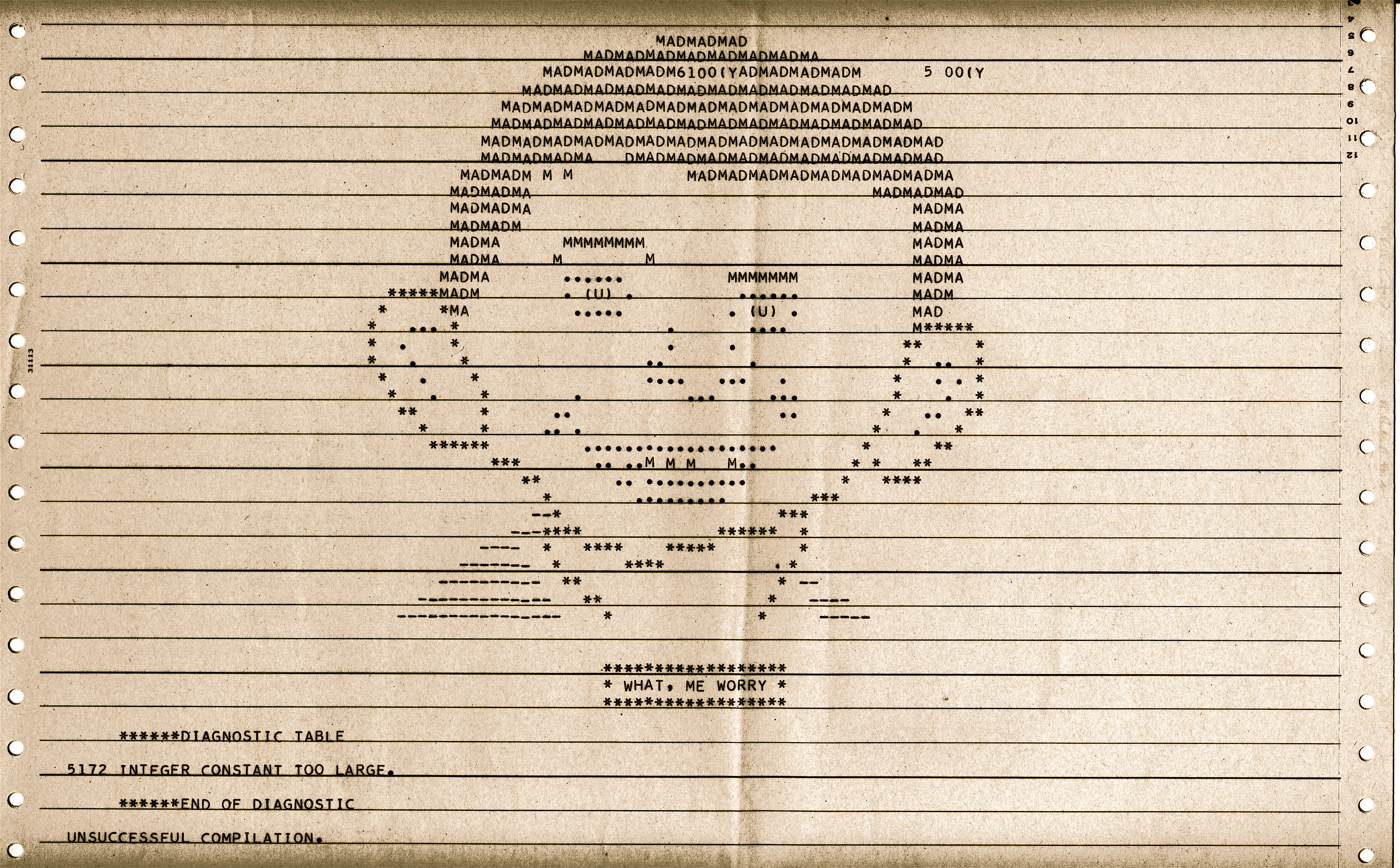
Line printer output following a MAD compiler error on an IBM 704 computer at the University of Michigan, c. 1960

In a pre-release version of the original MAD, as a reference to MAD's namesake, Mad magazine, when a program contained too many compile time errors the compiler would print a full-page picture of Alfred E. Neuman using ASCII art. The caption read, "See this man about your program--He might want to publish it. He never worries--but from the looks of your program, you should." This feature was not included in the final official version. However, it was included in the production version for the IBM 7040.

And Bernie Galler remembers:

By the time we designed the language that we thought would be worth doing and for which we could do a compiler, we couldn't call it Algol anymore; it really was different. That's when we adopted the name MAD, for the Michigan Algorithm Decoder. We had some funny interaction with the Mad magazine people, when we asked for permission to use the name MAD. In a very funny letter, they told us that they would take us to court and everything else, but ended the threat with a P.S. at the bottom - "Sure, go ahead." Unfortunately, that letter is lost.

== "Hello, world" example ==
The "hello, world" example program prints the string "Hello, world" to a terminal or screen display.

PRINT FORMAT HELLOW
VECTOR VALUES HELLOW=$13h0Hello, world*$
END OF PROGRAM

The first character of the line is treated as logical carriage control, in this example the character "0" which causes a double-spaced line to be printed.

Alternatively, contractions can be used, and the compiler will expand them in the listing:

P'T HELLOW
V'S HELLOW=$13h0Hello, world*$
E'M

== Language elements ==
MAD and GOM, but not MAD/I, are composed of the following elements:

=== Input format ===
MAD programs are a series of statements written on punched cards, generally one statement per card, although a statement can be continued to multiple cards. Columns 1-10 contains an optional statement label, comments or remarks are flagged using the letter "R" in column 11, and columns 73-80 are unused and could contain a sequence identifier. Spaces are not significant anywhere other than within character constants. For GOM input is free form with no sequence field and lines may be up to 255 characters long; lines that start with an asterisk (*) are comments; and lines that start with a plus-sign (+) are continuation lines.

=== Names ===
Variable names, function names, and statement labels have the same form, a letter followed by zero to five letters or digits. Function names end with a period. All names can be subscripted (the name followed by parentheses, with multiple subscripts separated by commas). For GOM names may be up to 24 characters long and may include the underscore (_) character.

Few keywords in the language are reserved words since most are longer than six letters or are surrounded by periods. There is a standard set of abbreviations which can be used to replace the longer words. These consist of the first and last letters of the keywords with an apostrophe between them, such as W'R for WHENEVER and D'N for DIMENSION.

=== Data types ===
MAD uses the term "mode" for its data types. Five basic modes are supported:

- Integer written with or without a scale factor (1, +1, -1, 1K10, 1K) or as octal constants (to 7777777777777K);
- Floating Point written with or without an exponent (0., 1.5, -0.05, +100.4, -4., .05E-2, -.05E2, 5E02, 5.E2);
- Boolean (1B for true and 0B for false);
- Statement Label, and
- Function Name written as a name followed by a period (SQRT.).

The mode of a constant can be redefined by adding the character M followed by a single digit at the end of the constant, where 0 indicates floating point, 1 integer, 2 boolean, 3 function name, and 4 statement label.

For GOM six additional modes are added: CHARACTER, SHORT INTEGER, BYTE INTEGER, LONG INTEGER, POINTER, and DYNAMIC RECORD.

Alphabetic or character constants are stored as integers and written using the dollar sign as a delimiter ($ABCDEF$) with double dollar-signs used to enter a true dollar sign ($$$.56$ is 56 cents). Strings longer than six characters are represented using arrays.

=== Arrays and matrices ===
- There is no limit on the number of dimensions.
- Negative and zero as well as floating-point subscripts are allowed.
- Matrices are storied in consecutive memory locations in the order determined by varying the rightmost subscript first.
- Matrices may be referenced using a subscript for each dimension, NAME(s_{1},s_{2},s_{3}), or using a single subscript, NAME(s_{1}).
- Input-output lists, VECTOR VALUES statements, and some subroutines allow the use of block notation, which has the form A,...,B or A...B, which is a reference to the entire region from A to B. inclusive. In terms of a vector, A(1)...A(N) would be A(1), A(2), A(3), ..., A(N).
- There are facilities that allow changing dimensions at run-time; permitting the programmer to vary the location of the initial element in an array within the overall block which has been set aside for the array; and allowing an arbitrary storage mapping to be specified.
List of operators, statements, and functions

=== Operators ===
==== Arithmetic operators ====
- .ABS. (unary absolute value)
- + (unary identity)
- - (unary negation)
- + (addition)
- - (subtraction)
- * (multiplication)
- / (division)
- .P. (exponentiation)
- .N. (bitwise negation)
- .A. (bitwise and)
- .V. (bitwise or)
- .EV. (bitwise exclusive or)
- .LS. (left shift)
- .RS. (right shift)
- .REM. (remainder, GOM only)

==== Pointer operators (GOM only) ====
- : (selection)
- .LOC. (location)
- .IND. (indirection)

==== Relational operators ====
- .L. (less than)
- .LE. (less than or equal)
- .E. (equal)
- .NE. (not equal)
- .G. (greater than)
- .GE. (greater than or equal)

==== Boolean operators ====
- .NOT. (unary logical not)
- .OR. (logical or)
- .EXOR. (logical exclusive or)
- .AND. (logical and)
- .THEN. (implies)
- .EQV. (equivalence)

==== Bit operators (GOM only) ====
- .SETBIT. (set bit to 1)
- .RESETBIT. (reset bit to 0)
- .BIT. (test bit)

=== Declaration statements ===
Variables may be implicitly or explicitly declared. By default all implicitly declared variables are assumed to be floating point. The NORMAL MODE IS statement may be used to change this default.

- FLOATING POINT var_{1}, var_{2}, ... (may include dimension information)
- INTEGER var_{1}, var_{2}, ... (may include dimension information)
- BOOLEAN var_{1}, var_{2}, ... (may include dimension information)
- FUNCTION NAME name_{1}, name_{2}, ... (may include dimension information)
- STATEMENT LABEL label_{1}, label_{2}, ... (may include dimension information)
- MODE NUMBER n, var_{1}, var_{2}, ... (may include dimension information)
- NORMAL MODE IS type-name (INTEGER, BOOLEAN, FLOATING POINT, STATEMENT LABEL, or FUNCTION NAME)
- NORMAL MODE IS MODE NUMBER n
- DIMENSION variable(max-dimension) (declares an array from 0...max-dimension)
- DIMENSION variable(from...to)
- DIMENSION variable(subscript_{1}, subscript_{2}, ..., subscript_{n}) (declares a multidimensional array)
- VECTOR VALUES array(n) = c_{1}, c_{2}, c_{3}, ...
- VECTOR VALUES array(m) ... array(n) = constant
- DOUBLE STORAGE MODE mode-list (doubles the amount of storage allocated for the modes listed)
- EQUIVALENCE (a_{1}, a_{2}, ..., a_{m}), ...
- PROGRAM COMMON a, b, c, ... (may include dimension information)
- ERASABLE a, b, c, ... (may include dimension information)
- PARAMETER A_{1}(B_{1}), A_{2}(B_{2}), ..., A_{n}(B_{n})
- SYMBOL TABLE VECTOR variable
- FULL SYMBOL TABLE VECTOR variable
- LISTING ON (the default)
- LISTING OFF
- REFERENCES ON
- REFERENCES OFF (the default)

=== Executable statements ===
- variable = expression (assignment)
- TRANSFER TO statement-label
- WHENEVER boolean-expression, executable-statement (simple conditional)
- WHENEVER boolean-expression (compound conditional)
  - OR WHENEVER boolean-expression
  - OTHERWISE
  - END OF CONDITIONAL
- CONTINUE (do nothing statement, usually used to carry a statement label)
- THROUGH statement-label, FOR VALUES OF variable = expression-list (iteration)

(where variable may be any mode including floating-point)

- SET LIST TO array-element, [ expression ]
- SAVE DATA list
- RESTORE DATA list
- PAUSE NO. octal-integer (stop execution, print an octal number on the operators console, allow manual restart)
- END OF PROGRAM (the last statement in all MAD programs)

=== Input and output statements ===
- READ DATA (reads data using a self-defining format, var1=value1, var2=value2, ..., varN=valueN
- READ AND PRINT DATA (similar to READ DATA, but data read is echoed to the printer)
- READ FORMAT format, list
- READ BCD TAPE n, format, list
- READ BINARY TAPE n, list
- PRINT RESULTS list
- PRINT BCD RESULTS list
- PRINT OCTAL RESULTS list
- PRINT COMMENT $string$ (first character of string is carriage control)
- PRINT FORMAT format, list
- PRINT ON LINE FORMAT format, list (display a message for the machine operator)
- WRITE BCD TAPE n, format, list
- WRITE BINARY TAPE n, list
- PUNCH FORMAT format, list
- LOOK AT FORMAT format, list (read data without advancing to next record)
- REWIND TAPE n
- END OF FILE TAPE n
- BACKSPACE RECORD OF TAPE n
- BACKSPACE RECORD OF TAPE n, IF LOAD POINT TRANSFER TO statement
- BACKSPACE FILE OF TAPE n
- BACKSPACE FILE OF TAPE n, IF LOAD POINT TRANSFER TO statement
- SET LOW DENSITY TAPE n
- SET HIGH DENSITY TABLE n
- REWIND TAPE n
- UNLOAD TAPE n
- FORMAT VARIABLE list (declaration, may include dimension information)

=== Functions ===
Function names end with a period. Internal and external functions are supported. Internal functions are compiled as part of the program in which they are used and share declarations and variables with the main program. External functions are compiled separately and do not share declarations and variables. A one statement definition of internal functions is permitted. Recursive functions are permitted, although the function must do some of the required saving and restoring work itself.

- INTERNAL FUNCTION function-name.(argument-list) = expression (single statement definition)
- INTERNAL FUNCTION function-name.(argument-list)
- EXTERNAL FUNCTION function-name.(argument-list)
- ENTRY TO NAME name.
- END OF FUNCTION (last statement in a multiple line definition)
- FUNCTION RETURN [ expression ]
- ERROR RETURN (force an error return to a statement or to the operating system, if no error statement is given as last argument of the call)
- SAVE RETURN
- RESTORE DATA
- RESTORE RETURN
- EXECUTE procedure.(argument-list) (call a non-single valued function)

== Operator definition and redefinition ==
One of the most interesting features in MAD is the ability to extend the language by redefining existing operators, defining new operators, or defining new data types (modes). The definitions are made using MAD declaration statements and assembly language mnemonics included following the declaration up to the END pseudo-instruction that implement the operation.

- DEFINE BINARY OPERATOR defined-op, PRECEDENCE rank existing-op MODE STRUCTURE mode-options
- DEFINE UNARY OPERATOR defined-op, PRECEDENCE rank existing-op MODE STRUCTURE mode-options
- MODE STRUCTURE mode-no = mode-no existing-op mode-no
- MODE STRUCTURE mode-no = mode-no existing-op mode-no SAME SEQUENCE AS mode-no existing-op mode-no

where:

- rank is one of SAME AS, LOWER THAN, or HIGHER THAN; and
- mode-options are the options that appear on the MODE STRUCTURE statement.

Three pre-defined packages of definitions (MATRIX, DOUBLE PRECISION, and COMPLEX) are available for inclusion in MAD source programs using the INCLUDE statement.

- INCLUDE package

== See also ==
- ALGOL 58
- ALGOL 60
