= Timeline of virtualization technologies =

In computing, virtualization is the use of a computer to simulate another computer. The following is a chronological list of virtualization technologies.

== Timeline ==
Note: This timeline is missing data for important historical systems, including: Atlas Computer (Manchester), GE 645, Burroughs B5000.

=== 1960s ===
In the mid-1960s, IBM's Cambridge Scientific Center develops CP-40, the first version of CP/CMS. Experience on the CP-40 project provides input to the development of the IBM System/360 Model 67, announced in 1965. CP-40 is re-implemented for the S/360-67 as CP-67, and by April 1967, both versions are in daily production use.

1964

- IBM Cambridge Scientific Center begins development of CP-40.

1965

- IBM M44/44X, an experimental paging operating system, is in use at Thomas J. Watson Research Center.
- IBM announces the IBM System/360-67, a 32-bit CPU with virtual memory hardware (August 1965).

1966

- IBM ships the S/360-67 computer in June 1966.
- IBM begins work on CP-67, a re-implementation of CP-40 for the S/360-67.

1967

- In January, CP-40 goes into production time-sharing use, followed by CP-67 in April.

1968

- CP/CMS is installed at eight initial customer sites.
- CP/CMS is submitted to IBM Type-III Library by MIT's Lincoln Laboratory.
- Resale of CP/CMS access begins at time-sharing vendor National CSS (becoming a distinct version, eventually renamed VP/CSS).

=== 1970s ===
IBM announces the System/370 in 1970. In 1972, IBM announces that virtual memory would be made available on all S/370 models, and also announces several virtual storage operating systems, including VM/370. By the mid-1970s, CP/CMS, VM, and VP/CSS are running on numerous large IBM mainframes.

1971

- The first System/370, the S/370-155, is shipped in January.

1972

- Announcement of virtual memory being added to System/370 series.
- VM/370 announced – and running on announcement date. VM/370 includes the ability to run VM under VM (previously implemented both at IBM and at user sites under CP/CMS, but not made part of standard releases)

1973

- First shipment of announced virtual memory S/370 models (April: -158, May: -168).

1977

- Initial commercial release of VAX/VMS, later renamed OpenVMS.

1979

- The chroot system call is introduced during development of Version 7 Unix, laying a foundation for container virtualization.

=== 1980s ===
1985

- October 9, 1985: Announcement of the Intel 80286-based AT&T 6300+ with Simultask, a virtual machine monitor developed by Locus Computing Corporation in collaboration with AT&T, enabling the direct execution of an Intel 8086 realmode guest operating system under a host Unix System V Release 2 OS.

1987

- January 1987: A "product evaluation" version of Merge/386 from Locus Computing Corporation is made available to OEMs. Merge/386 made use of the Virtual 8086 mode provided by the Intel 80386 processor, and supported multiple simultaneous virtual 8086 machines. The virtual machines supported unmodified guest operating systems and standalone programs such as Microsoft Flight Simulator; but in typical usage the guest was MS-DOS with a Locus proprietary redirector (also marketed for networked PCs as "PC-Interface") and a "network" driver that provided communication with a regular user-mode file server process running under the host operating system on the same machine.
- October 1987: Retail Version 1.0 of Merge/386 begins shipping, offered with Microport Unix System V Release 3.

1988

- SoftPC 1.0 for Sun is introduced in 1988 by Insignia Solutions.
- SoftPC appears in its first version for Apple Macintosh. These versions (Sun and Macintosh) only have support for DOS.

=== 1990s ===
1991

- IBM introduces OS/2 Virtual DOS machine (VDM) with support for x86 virtual 8086 mode, capable of virtualizing DOS/Windows and other 16 bit operating systems like CP/M-86

1994

- Kevin Lawton leaves MIT Lincoln Lab and starts the Bochs project. Bochs was initially coded for x86 architecture, capable of emulating BIOS, processor and other x86-compatible hardware, by simple algorithms, isolated from the rest of the environment, eventually incorporating the ability to run different processor algorithms under x86-architecture or the host, including bios and core processor (Itanium x64, x86_64, ARM, MIPS, PowerPC, etc.), and with the advantage that the application is multi platform (BSD, Linux, Windows, Mac, Solaris).

1997

- The first version of Virtual PC for the Macintosh platform is released in June 1997 by Connectix.

1998

- June 15: Simics/sun4m is presented at USENIX'98, demonstrating full system simulation booting Linux 2.0.30 and Solaris 2.6 unmodified from dd'ed disks. .
- October 26: VMware files for a patent on their techniques, which was granted as U.S. Patent 6,397,242

1999

- February 8: VMware introduces the first x86 virtualization product for the Intel IA-32 architecture, known as VMware Virtual Platform, based on earlier research by its founders at Stanford University. VMware Virtual Platform is based on software emulation with a guest/host OS design that required all guest environments be stored as files under the host OS filesystem.

=== 2000s ===
2000

- FreeBSD 4.0 is released, including initial implementation of FreeBSD jails.
- IBM announces z/VM, a new version of the VM operating system for IBM's 64-bit z/Architecture.

2001

- January 31, 2001, AMD and Virtutech release Simics/x86-64 ("Virtuhammer") to support the new 64-bit architecture for x86. Virtuhammer is used to port Linux distributions and the Windows kernel to x86-64 well before the first x86-64 processor (Opteron) was available in April 2003.
- June, Connectix launches its first version of Virtual PC for Windows.
- July, VMware creates the first x86 server virtualization product.
- Egenera, Inc. launches their Processor Area Network (PAN Manager) software and BladeFrame chassis which provide hardware virtualization of processing blade's (pBlade) internal disk, network interface cards, and serial console.
- The first version of Virtuozzo, based on OpenVZ, is released.

2003

- First release of first open-source x86 hypervisor, Xen.
- February 18: Microsoft acquires virtualization technologies (Virtual PC and unreleased product called "Virtual Server") from Connectix Corporation.
- February 18: Development begins on QEMU, a free and open-source hardware emulator.
- Late 2003: EMC acquires VMware for $635 million.
- Late 2003: VERITAS acquires Ejascent for $59 million.
- November 10, 2003 Microsoft releases Microsoft Virtual PC, which is a machine-level virtualization technology.

2005

- HP releases Integrity Virtual Machines 1.0 and 1.2 which ran only HP-UX.
- October 24, 2005 VMware releases VMware Player, a free player for virtual machines.
- Sun releases Solaris 10, including Solaris Zones, for both x86/x64 and SPARC systems.
- December 19, 2005 First release of the open-source platform virtualisation manager, libvirt.

2006

- June 15, 2006
- July 12, 2006 VMware releases VMware Server, a free machine-level virtualization product for the server market.
- Microsoft Virtual PC 2006 is released as a free program, also in July.
- July 17, 2006 Microsoft bought Softricity.
- August 16, 2006 VMware announces the winners of the virtualization appliance contest.
- September 26, 2006 moka5 delivers LivePC technology.
- HP releases Integrity Virtual Machines Version 2.0, which supports Windows Server 2003, CD and DVD burners, tape drives and VLAN.
- December 11, 2006 Virtual Iron releases Virtual Iron 3.1, a free bare-metal virtualization product for the enterprise server virtualization market.

2007

- KVM, a virtualization module integrated into the Linux kernel, is released.
- January 15, 2007 InnoTek releases VirtualBox Open Source Edition (OSE), the first professional PC virtualization solution released as open source under the GNU General Public License (GPL). It includes some code from the QEMU project.
- Sun releases Solaris 8 Containers to enable migration of a Solaris 8 computer into a Solaris Container on a Solaris 10 system – for SPARC only.
- September 24, 2007 Microsoft releases the first public build of its hypervisor, Hyper-V, codenamed "Viridian".

2008

- The first Linux kernel mainline featuring cgroups (developed by Google since 2006) is released, laying a foundation for later technologies like LXC, Docker, Systemd-nspawn and Podman.
- January 15, 2008 VMware, Inc. announces it has entered into a definitive agreement to acquire Thinstall, a privately held application virtualization software company.
- February 12, 2008 Sun Microsystems announces that it had entered into a stock purchase agreement to acquire InnoTek, makers of VirtualBox.
- April: VMware releases VMware Workstation 6.5 beta, the first program for Windows and Linux to enable DirectX 9 accelerated graphics on Windows XP guests .
- August 6: LXC, an OS-level virtualization method for Linux, is released.

=== 2010s ===
2011

- The first stable version of QEMU is released.

2013

- Docker, Inc. releases Docker, a series of platform as a service (PaaS) products that use OS-level virtualization.

2014

- The first public build of Kubernetes is released on September 8, 2014. When Kubernetes debuted, it offered a number of advantages over Docker, the most popular containerization platform at the time. The purpose of Kubernetes was to make it simple for users to deploy containerized applications across a sizable cluster of container hosts. In order to offer more features and functionality for managing containerized applications at scale, Kubernetes was created to complement Docker rather than to completely replace it.
