= History of CP/CMS =

This article covers the History of CP/CMS — the historical context in which the IBM time-sharing virtual machine operating system was built.

CP/CMS development occurred in a complex political and technical milieu.

Historical notes, below, provides supporting quotes and citations from first-hand observers.

== Early 60s: CTSS, early time-sharing, and Project MAC ==
The seminal first-generation time-sharing system was CTSS, first demonstrated at MIT in 1961 and in production use from 1964 to 1974. It paved the way for Multics, CP/CMS, and all other time-sharing environments. Time-sharing concepts were first articulated in the late 50s, particularly as a way to meet the needs of scientific computing. At the time, computers were primarily used for batch processing — where jobs were submitted on punch cards, and run in sequence. Time-sharing let users interact directly with a computer, so that calculation and simulation results could be seen immediately.

Scientific users quickly embraced the concept of time-sharing, and pressured computer vendors such as IBM for improved time-sharing capabilities. MIT researchers spearheaded this effort, launching Project MAC, which was intended to develop the next generation of time-sharing technology and which would ultimately build Multics, an extremely feature-rich time-sharing system that would later inspire the initial development of UNIX. This high-profile team of leading computer scientists formed very specific technical recommendations and requirements, seeking an appropriate hardware platform for their new system. The technical problems were awesome. Most early time-sharing systems sidestepped these problems by giving users new or modified languages, such as Dartmouth BASIC, which were accessed through interpreters or restricted execution contexts. But the Project MAC vision was for shared, unrestricted access to general-purpose computing.

Along with other vendors, IBM submitted a proposal to Project MAC. However, IBM's proposal was not well received: To IBM's surprise, MIT chose General Electric as the Multics system vendor. The fallout from this event led directly to CP/CMS.

== IBM and the System/360 ==
In the early 60s, IBM was struggling to define its technical direction. The company had identified a problem with its past computer offerings: incompatibility between the many IBM products and product lines. Each new product family, and each new generation of technology, forced customers to wrestle with an entirely new set of technical specifications. IBM products incorporated a wide variety of processor designs, memory architectures, instruction sets, input/output strategies, etc. This was not, of course, unique to IBM. All computer vendors seemed to begin each new system with a "clean sheet" design. IBM saw this as both a problem and an opportunity. The cost of software migration was an increasing barrier to hardware sales. Customers could not afford to upgrade their computers, and IBM wanted to change this.

IBM embarked on a very risky undertaking: the System/360. This product line was intended to replace IBM's diverse earlier offerings, including the IBM 7000 series, the canceled IBM 8000 series, the IBM 1130 series, and various other specialized machines used for scientific and other applications. The System/360 would span an unprecedented range of processing power, memory size, device support, and cost; and more important, it was based on a pledge of backward compatibility, such that any customer could move software to a new system without modification. In today's world of standard interfaces and portable systems, this may not seem such a radical goal; but at the time, it was revolutionary. Before System/360, each computer model often had its own specific devices and programs that could not be used with other systems. Buying a bigger CPU also meant buying new printers, card readers, tape drives, etc. In addition, customers would have to rewrite their programs to run on the new CPU, something customers often balked at. With the S/360, IBM wanted to offer a huge range of computer systems, all sharing a single processor architecture, instruction set, I/O interface, and operating system. Customers would be able to "mix and match" to meet current needs; and they could confidently upgrade their systems in the future, without the need to rewrite all their software applications. IBM's focus remained on its traditional customer base: large organizations doing administrative and business data processing.

At the start of the System/360 project, IBM did not fully appreciate the amount of risk involved. System/360 ultimately gave IBM total dominance over the computer industry; but at first, it nearly put IBM out of business. IBM took on one of the largest and most ambitious engineering projects in history, and in the process discovered diseconomies of scale and the mythical man-month. Extensive literature on the period, such as that by Fred Brooks, illustrate the pitfalls.

It was during the period of System/360 panic that Project MAC asked IBM to provide computers with extensive time-sharing capabilities. This was not the direction the System/360 project was going. Time-sharing wasn't seen as important to IBM's main customer base; batch processing was key. Moreover, time-sharing was new ground. Many of the concepts involved, such as virtual memory, remained unproven. For example: At the time, nobody could explain why the troubled Manchester/Ferranti Atlas virtual memory "didn't work". (Note: Contrary to this slur, repeated at third hand by IBM's VM proponents, it did work.) This was later explained as due to thrashing, based on CP/CMS and M44/44X research. As a result, IBM's System/360 announcement in April 1964 did not include key elements sought by the time-sharing advocates, particularly virtual memory capabilities. Project MAC researchers were crushed and angered by this decision. The System/360 design team met with Project MAC researchers, and listened to their objections; but IBM chose another path.

In February 1964, at the height of these events, IBM had launched its Cambridge Scientific Center (CSC), headed by Norm Rassmussen. CSC was to serve as the link between MIT researchers and the IBM labs, and was located in the same building with Project MAC. IBM fully expected to win the Project MAC competition, and to retain its perceived lead in scientific computing and time-sharing.

One of CSC's first projects was to submit IBM's Project MAC proposal. IBM had received intelligence that MIT was leaning toward the GE proposal, which was for a modified 600-series computer with virtual memory hardware and other enhancements; this would eventually become the GE 645. IBM proposed a modified S/360 that would include a virtual memory device called the "Blaauw Box" – a component that had been designed for, but not included in, the S/360. The MIT team rejected IBM's proposal. The modified S/360 was seen as too different from the rest of the S/360 line; MIT did not want to use a customized or special-purpose computer for MULTICS, but sought hardware that would be widely available. GE was prepared to make a large commitment to time-sharing, while IBM was seen as obstructive. Bell Laboratories, another important IBM customer, soon made the same decision, and rejected the S/360 for time-sharing.

== 1964–67: CP-40, S/360-67, and TSS ==
The loss of Project MAC was devastating for CSC, which essentially lost its reason for existence. Rasmussen remained committed to time-sharing, and wanted to earn back the confidence of MIT and other researchers. To do this, he made a bold decision: The now-idle CSC team would build a time-sharing operating system for the S/360. Robert Creasy left Project MAC to lead the CSC team, which promptly began work on what was to become CP-40, the first successful virtual machine operating system based on fully virtualized hardware.

IBM's loss of Project MAC and Bell Laboratories caused repercussions elsewhere at IBM.

- IBM created a corporate task force to find a satisfactory way to meet customer time-sharing requirements. The team, which included key staff from CSC, designed a new S/360 model that was closer to the goals of the MIT researchers. This was to become the IBM System/360-67, announced in August 1965 and shipped in July 1966. IBM's announcement also included a new time-sharing operating system, TSS/360, optimistically scheduled for June 1967 release.
- IBM reorganized its development and manufacturing divisions to correct perceived problems, and perhaps to punish those responsible for IBM's loss of face.

CSC soon submitted a successful proposal to MIT's Lincoln Laboratory for a S/360-67, marking an improvement in IBM's credibility at MIT. By committing to a "real" time-sharing product, rather than a customized RPQ system, IBM was showing the kind of commitment MIT found with GE.

CSC also continued work on CP-40, ostensibly to provide research input to the S/360-67 team — but also because the CSC team had grown skeptical about the TSS project, which faced a very aggressive schedule and lofty goals. Since a S/360-67 would not be available to CSC for some time, the team conceived an ingenious stopgap measure: building their own virtual-memory S/360. They designed a set of custom hardware and microcode changes that could be implemented on a S/360-40, providing a comparable platform capable of supporting CP-40's virtual machine architecture. Actual CP-40 and CMS development began in mid 1965, even before the arrival of their modified S/360-40. First production use of CP-40 was in January 1967.

The TSS project, in the meantime, was running late and struggling with problems. CSC personnel became increasingly convinced that CP/CMS was the correct architecture for S/360 time-sharing.

== 1967–68: CP-67 ==
In September 1966, CSC staff began the conversion of CP-40 and CMS to run on the S/360-67. CP-67 was a significant reimplementation of CP-40; Varian reports that the design was "generalized substantially, to allow a variable number of virtual machines, with larger virtual memories", that new data structures replaced "the control blocks describing the virtual machines [which] had been a hard-coded part of the nucleus", that CP-67 added "the concept of free storage, so that control blocks could be allocated dynamically", and that "the inter-module linkage was also reworked, and the code was made re-entrant." Since CSC's -67 would not arrive for some time, CSC further modified the microcode on its own customized S/360-40 to simulate the S/360-67 – particularly its different approach to virtual memory. CSC repeatedly and successfully used simulation to work around the absence of hardware: when waiting for its modified S/360-40, for its S/360-67, and later for the first S/370 prototypes. This can be seen as a logical outgrowth of "virtual machine" thinking. During this period, early testing of CP-67 was also done at sites where S/360-67 hardware was available – notably IBM's Yorktown Heights lab and MIT's Lincoln Laboratory.

Observers of CP-67 at Lincoln Labs, already frustrated with severe TSS problems, were very impressed by CP-67. They insisted that IBM provide them a copy of CP/CMS. According to Varian, this demand "rocked the whole company", which had invested so heavily in TSS. However, because the site was so critical, IBM complied. Varian and others speculate that this chain of events could have been "engineered" by Rasmussen, as a "subterfuge" to motivate IBM's continued funding CSC's work on the "counter-strategic" CP/CMS, which he "was told several times to kill".

By April 1967 – just a few months after CP-40 went into production – CP/CMS was already in daily use at Lincoln Labs. Lincoln Lab personnel worked closely with CSC in improving CP/CMS. They "began enhancing CP and CMS as soon as they were delivered. The Lincoln and Cambridge people worked together closely and exchanged code on a regular basis", beginning a tradition of code sharing and mutual support that would continue for years. At around the same time, Union Carbide, another influential IBM customer, followed the same path – deciding to run CP/CMS, to send personnel to work with CSC, and to contribute to the CP/CMS development effort.

CP-40, CP-67, and CMS were essentially research systems at the time, built away from IBM's mainstream product organizations, with active involvement of outside researchers. Experimenting was both an important goal and a constant activity. Robert Creasy, the CP-40 project leader, later wrote:

The design of CP/CMS [was] by a small and varied software research and development group for its own use and support… [and] for experimenting with time-sharing system design.... Schedules and budgets, plans and performance goals did not have to be met.… We also expected to redo the system at least once after we got it going. For most of the group, it was meant to be a learning experience. Efficiency was specifically excluded as a software design goal, although it was always considered. We did not know if the system would be of practical use.... In January, 1965, after starting work on the system, it became apparent from presentations to outside groups that the system would be controversial.

TSS, in the meantime, described by Varian as an "elegant and very ambitious system," was exhibiting "serious stability and performance problems, for it had been snatched from its nest too young." In February 1968, at the time of SHARE 30, there were eighteen S/360-67 sites attempting to run TSS. During the conference, IBM announced via "blue letter" that TSS was being decommitted — a great blow to the time-sharing community. This decision would be temporarily reversed, and TSS would not be scrapped until 1971. (Note: There were three release of the TSS/370 PRPQ for customers still using TSS/360.) However, CP/CMS soon began gaining attention as a viable alternative.

== 1968–72: CP/CMS releases ==
- May 1968: Version 1 of CP/CMS was released to eight installations. It was made available as part of the IBM Type-III Library in June. Shortly thereafter, two time-sharing businesses were launched based on the resale of CP/CMS: National CSS and IDC. These ventures took key personnel from CSC, Lincoln Labs, and Union Carbide; and they drew attention to the viability of CP/CMS, the S/360-67, and virtual memory.
- April 1969: CP/CMS had been installed at fifteen sites.
- June 1969: Version 2 of CP/CMS was released.
- November 1971: Version 3.1 of CP/CMS was released, capable of supporting sixty CMS users on a -67 – impressive performance.
- Early 1972: CP/CMS Version 3.2 was released, a maintenance release with no new functions. CP-67 was now running on 44 processors, a quarter of which were inside IBM.

At the time of the S/360-67, software was "bundled" into computer hardware purchases; see "IBM's unbundling of software and services". In particular, IBM operating systems were available without additional charge to IBM customers. CP/CMS was unusual in that it was delivered as unsupported Type-III software in source code form – meaning that CP/CMS sites ran an unsupported operating system. The need for self-support and community support helped lead to the creation of a strong S/360-67 and CP/CMS user communities, precursors to the open source movement.

In the summer of 1970, the CP/CMS team had begun work on a System/370 version of CP/CMS; this would become VM/370. CP-370 proved vital to the S/370 project, by providing a usable simulation of a S/370 on S/360-67 hardware – a reprise of CSC's earlier hardware simulation strategies. This approach enabled S/370 development and testing before S/370 hardware was available. A shortage of prototype S/370s was causing critical delays for the MVS project, in particular. This remarkable technical feat transformed MVS development, won an award for the CP-370 developers, and probably rescued the CP project from extinction, despite aggressive efforts to cancel the project.

August 1972 marked the end of CP/CMS, with IBM's "System/370 Advanced Function" announcement. This included: the new S/370-158 and -168; address relocation hardware on all S/370s; and four new operating systems: DOS/VS (DOS with virtual storage), OS/VS1 (OS/MFT with virtual storage), OS/VS2 (OS/MVT with virtual storage, which would grow into SVS and MVS), and VM/370 — the re-implemented CP/CMS. By this time the VM and CP/CMS development team had swelled to 110 people, including documenters. VM/370 was now a real IBM system, no longer part of the IBM Type-III Library. Source code distribution continued for several releases, however; see CP/CMS as free software for details.

== 1968–86?: VP/CSS ==
In 1968, the principals of a small consulting firm in Connecticut called Computer Software Systems had the audacious idea of leasing an IBM System/360-67 to run CP/CMS and reselling computer time. It was audacious because IBM would not typically lease its $50–100K/month systems to a two-person startup. The third and fourth employees were Dick Orenstein, one of the authors of CTSS, and Dick Bayles, from CSC – the primary architect of CP-67. Other key hires from the CP/CMS world included Harold Feinleib, Mike Field, and Robert Jesurum (Bob Jay).

By late November 1968, having persuaded IBM to accept the order (no small feat) and secured initial funding, CSS took delivery on their first S/360-67. They began selling time in December 1968.

CSS quickly discovered that, by selling every available virtual machine minute at published prices, they could barely take in enough revenue to pay the machine lease. A whirlwind development program followed, ramping up CP/CMS performance to the point where it could be resold profitably. This began a fork of CP/CMS source code that evolved independently for some fifteen years. This operating system was soon renamed VP/CSS; the company went public, and was renamed National CSS.

Although VP/CSS shared much with its CP/CMS parent and its VM/370 sibling, it diverged from them in many important ways. For business reasons, the system had to run at a profit; and its users, if frustrated, could stop paying at any time simply by hanging up the phone. These forces gave a high priority to factors affecting performance, usability, and customer support. VP/CSS soon became known for routinely supporting two to three times as many interactive users as on comparable VM systems.

Early NCSS enhancements involved such areas as page migration, dispatching, file system, device support, and efficient fast-path hypervisor functions accessed via the diagnose (DIAG) instruction. Later features included a packet-switched network, FILEDEF-level (pipe) interprocess/intermachine communication, and database integration. Similar features also appeared in the VM implementation. Ultimately, the NCSS development team rivaled the size of IBM's, implementing a wide array of features. The VP/CSS platform remained in use through at least the mid-80s. NCSS was acquired by Dun & Bradstreet in 1979; renamed DBCS (Dun & Bradstreet Computer Services); increased its focus on the NOMAD product; changed its business strategy to embrace VM and other platforms; and in the process discontinued support and development of VP/CSS, probably the last non-VM fork of CP/CMS.

== 1964?–72?: IDC's use of CP/CMS ==
Interactive Data Corporation (IDC) followed a plan similar to that of National CSS, selling time-sharing services based on the CP/CMS platform. Its focus at the time was in financial services. Varian reports that IDC had "several" S/360-67 systems running CP/CMS and one of IBM's "first relocating S/370", presumably referring to the S/370-145 of 1971, with the first DAT box; but perhaps to the systems announced in 1972 with the "System/370 Advanced Function" announcement, including the S/370-158 and -168.

[Further details and citations are sought on the history of IDC and CP/CMS time-sharing.]

== Historical notes ==
The following notes provide brief quotes, primarily from Pugh and Varian [see references], illustrating the development context of CP/CMS. Direct quotes rather than paraphrases are provided here, because the authors' perspectives color their interpretations.

- Early time-sharing and CTSS: Christopher Strachey filed a patent application for "time-sharing" in February 1959. He gave a paper "Time Sharing in Large Fast Computers" at the first UNESCO Information Processing Conference in Paris in June that year, where he passed the concept on to J. C. R. Licklider. CTSS was the seminal system that "taught the world how to do time-sharing." It was first demonstrated at MIT in 1961, on an IBM 709, and was in production use from 1964 to 1974. Programmers were Marjorie Merwin-Daggett, Robert Daley, Robert Creasy, Jessica Hellwig, Richard Orenstein (later a cofounder of National CSS), and Lyndalee Korn, all working under Professor Fernando Corbató. MIT developers asked for and received considerable assistance from IBM in making hardware modifications to facilitate CTSS processing. Creasy describes the important influence of CTSS on CP/CMS: "CTSS… most strongly influenced the CP/CMS system design.… [It] provided a subset of the machine for use by normal batch programs… run without modification as with a normal system. The time-sharing supervisor would steal and restore the machine without their knowledge. This technique was extended to its fullest in CP/CMS. Many other CTSS design elements and system facilities, like the user interface, terminal control, disk file system, and attachment of other computers, served as operational prototypes.… The necessity of compatibility for evolutionary growth of software was demonstrated by CTSS; for hardware, by the IBM System/360 family."
- Role of John McCarthy (of LISP fame) in timesharing: "At about this time [April 1961] John McCarthy… gave a special evening lecture [stressing the future importance of time-sharing that] ended on the speculative note that computation might eventually 'be organized as a public utility, just as the telephone system is a public utility.' This insightful prediction can be seen to anticipate the role of the Internet. Similar sentiments were later expressed forcefully by Alan Kay and others. IBM leadership had a very different view of computation.
- IBM and MIT: IBM’s president T.J. Watson "had very shrewdly given" MIT an IBM 704 for use by MIT and other New England schools, beginning what was to be a very close relationship. IBM established an MIT Liaison Office, housed at the MIT Computation Center, staffing it with skilled technicians. Watson recalls that he "went up to MIT in 1955 and urged them to start training computer scientists.… [with] a very aggressive college discount program… [so that] within five years there was a whole new generation of computer scientists who made it possible for the market to boom." Varian adds the following interesting footnote: "It appears that (without a clear directive from Corporate management) IBM’s Cambridge Branch Office decided to interpret Watson’s original grant to MIT as authorization for them to upgrade the system at MIT whenever IBM produced a more powerful computer."
- Project MAC and MULTICS: MIT's Project MAC was launched in 1963 to build a new time-sharing system following in the footsteps of CTSS. IBM submitted a bid to provide a modified S/360 with address translation (the "Blaauw Box"), which was also bid to Bell Labs around the same time. MIT and Bell Labs both chose another vendor. This had "important consequences for IBM. Seldom after that would IBM processors be the machines of choice for leading-edge academic computer science research." MULTICS and UNIX (plus various other minicomputer platforms) became the de facto research systems.
- MIT input to S/360: IBM personnel with close ties to MIT became "strong proponents of time-sharing" and kept System/360 designers aware of work at MIT, including the purpose of the CTSS hardware enhancements. System/360 architects visited MIT and talked with Professor Corbató. Nevertheless, the IBM belief was now that "time-sharing would never amount to anything and that what the world needed was faster batch processing." When the System/360 was announced in 1964 without address relocation, MIT and other time-sharing advocates felt betrayed.
- Virtual memory and timesharing: "In June [1964]...[MIT was] adamant that hardware-aided dynamic address translation (DAT) was essential" for time-sharing, a "still-experimental mode of operation whereby users at several consoles could share the facilities of a computer.... The most fundamental problem....was that of reallocating memory areas to user programs dynamically." MIT wouldn't back down on this position, felt betrayed by IBM, and ultimiately turned away from IBM to GE for a MULTICS platform.
- Cambridge Scientific Center (CSC): Established in 1964 by Norm Rasmussen, in the same building with Project MAC (a location with "ten or fifteen time-sharing systems being coded or tested or accessed" in the mid 60s), CSC developed and maintained close ties with MIT researchers. "All of IBM’s contractual relationships with MIT were turned over to the new Scientific Center to administer." After losing Project MAC, the team unexpectedly had nothing to do. This was the environment where CP-40 came to life.
- Two competing strategies at IBM in 1964: IBM engineers were divided over the right technical path for the company:
  - "Unifying the architecture and control programs of business and scientific computers both large and small" (championed by Brooks/Amdahl; this group rejected dynamic address translation, fearing "unevaluated techniques or technologies" as the basis of an entire product line), versus
  - Changing "the way computing power was meted out in universities and laboratories" (i.e. timesharing, championed by MIT researchers working closely with IBM).
- Divided opinion about the S/360: CSC staff became champions of the System/360 architecture, in the face of deep skepticism in the scientific community. Creasy notes: "The family concept of the IBM System/360… was a most amazing turning point in computer development, one which was not universally greeted with enthusiasm. We believed [at CSC] that the architecture of System/360, combining scientific and commercial instruction sets, would be around for a significant period of time. [Eliminating] the trauma associated with widespread recoding of programs [via the S/360 promise of backward compatibility] also pointed to a long life. In addition, we speculated that many operating systems and a large number of application programs would be produced over the lifetime of that machine design." These proved to be good predictions.
- IBM's 1965 reorganization: The two IBM product divisions pursuing time-sharing development — Advanced Systems Development Division (ASDD) and Data Systems Division (DSD) — were "phased out; their… resources were assigned to the new Systems Development Division (SDD)… and the new Systems Manufacturing Division [(SMD)]." The disbanding of large organizations previously responsible for time-sharing efforts suggests the political forces at work.
- 360/67 and TSS: Rasmussen felt betrayed by IBM's decision to ignore time-sharing, and he decided "that the Cambridge Scientific Center would write a time-sharing system for System/360." The loss of Project MAC had finally attracted attention within IBM, and resources were made available to help "win bids for time-sharing systems." Rough specifications were prepared for the new S/360-67, which would incorporate address translation (via the "DAT Box", which unlike the "Blaauw Box", supported both segment and page tables) and a new operating system: TSS. "A group of six sites… had a non-disclosure agreement" during the system's development (probably Lincoln Lab, University of Michigan, Carnegie University, Bell Labs, General Motors, and Union Carbide). The University of Michigan and MIT's Lincoln Laboratory were two of the first sales, and had a role in the hardware design. TSS was announced in August 1965, an "elegant and very ambitious system" but "snatched from its nest too young" with "serious stability and performance problems."
- CSC financial resources: Rasmussen used creative accounting to fund the creation of CP-40. Varian: "When IBM gave the 7094 to the MIT Computation Center, it retained the night shift on that machine for its own use. So, because the Scientific Center had inherited IBM’s contracts with MIT, Rasmussen 'owned' eight hours of 7094 time per day. He traded part of that time to the [MIT] Computation Center for CTSS time for his programmers to use in doing their development work. He 'sold' the remainder [of the 7094 time] to IBM hardware developers in Poughkeepsie, who badly needed 7094 time to run a design automation program that was critical for System/360 hardware development. With the internal funds he acquired this way, he paid for the modifications to the Model 40… [and for] part-time employees, mainly MIT students, and to pay the [temporary] salaries of IBMers who came to Cambridge to work on the system… [using] 'unbudgeted revenues'...to keep a very low profile." Rasmussen also sold spare time on another, temporary S/360-40, provided by IBM to CSC while they waited for their modified virtual memory system. If there was a perception at MIT that MIT funds went into CP/CMS, it may have come from these complicated transactions. Of course, regardless of funding issues, researchers from outside IBM, especially from MIT and Union Carbide, clearly made direct and indirect contributions. This also would have clouded perceptions of authorship.
- Anti-timesharing decisions: "During 1961 and 1962 time-sharing [efforts had involved] close contact with the MIT Computation Center through sales and special engineering personnel." After MIT's criticisms, and their ultimate choice of GE for MULTICS, an IBM task force "made useful suggestions but effectively endorsed the work of the 360 designers by reporting that too little was known about the time-sharing mode of operation to justify [its pursuit].… In 1967, an industry observer counted about forty general-purpose time-sharing installations in the United States – up from ten in 1965 and up from one (the MIT demonstration) in 1961. Some of the cost of development was being offset by a research agency in the Department of Defense, which sponsored six of the first dozen."
- Informal release of CP/CMS: CP-67/CMS "was announced informally because it was developed outside of the product development organizations in the product and marketing divisions. See IBM Installation Newsletter 68-10, 31 May 1968, 'New Type III Programs,' pp. 13–5." Note that this description does not mention company politics, the possible use of public funds, the role of Lincoln Labs, etc.
- Relationship of early time-sharing to introduction of HP-35: Before the availability of powerful handheld calculators in 1972, during the "first decade of time-sharing, one use for a terminal was to request minor calculations that needed to be carried to more decimal places than possible with a slide rule." This was one reason time-sharing was so important to scientific and academic users.
- Virtual memory, and IBM's fear of risk: "In the aftermath of the System/360 trauma," a reference to large-project woes such as those described by Fred Brooks, IBM executives "took steps to ensure that the company would never again become committed to such a high-risk program." At the height of this loin-girding is when timesharing and virtual memory were shunted aside by IBM, in favor of mainstream commercial batch processing. It is ironic that, by 1970–71, other forces within IBM "set in motion an effort to create the Future System (FS) [project with] technological objectives at least as risky as those of System/360.… Three and a half years later, the project was abandoned." It is well known that Gene Amdahl, a key FS player, continued to pursue FS objectives and technologies after leaving IBM.
- Intent and use of CP/CMS: Creasy provides this insight: "CMS was developed… to support its own development and maintenance… [and] maintain the other components of VM/370.… In most cases, a subset of features was selected [to implement,] with the expectation of future work. We expected many operating systems to flourish in the virtual machine environment. What better place for experimentation with new system ideas? This has not been the case. Instead, many features were added to CMS to extend its usage into areas better served by new systems." A generation later, as we face a diversity of platforms built in the collaborative open source world, it is easy to understand Creasy's hopes for CP/CMS as a development incubator, and his disappointment in what must have seemed missed opportunities. This has been the fate of many research systems, but few share the 40+ year arc of the concepts launched with CP-40.

== See also ==
- CP-40 – the IBM research system that validated the virtual machine concept
- VM – IBM's virtual machine operating system family, a reimplementation of CP/CMS
- Virtualization and hypervisor – concepts pioneered with CP/CMS
- IBM System/360-67 – the main CP/CMS hardware platform
- VP/CSS – a proprietary operating system from National CSS that began as a fork of CP/CMS source code
- Time-sharing – an industry heavily influenced by CP/CMS
- Time-sharing system evolution

== Family tree ==
CP/CMS family relationships
→ derivation >> strong influence > some influence/precedence
CTSS
CTSS	> IBM M44/44X
CTSS	>> CP-40/CMS → CP[-67]/CMS	→ VM/370 → VM/SE versions → VM/SP versions → VM/XA versions → VM/ESA → z/VM
CTSS	>> CP-40/CMS → CP[-67]/CMS	→ VP/CSS
CTSS	> TSS/360
CTSS	> TSO for MVT → for OS/VS2 → for MVS → ... → for z/OS
CTSS	>> MULTICS and most other time-sharing platforms
