= Time-sharing system evolution =

This article covers the evolution of time-sharing systems, providing links to major early time-sharing operating systems, showing their subsequent evolution.

The meaning of the term time-sharing has shifted from its original usage. From 1949 to 1960, time-sharing was used to refer to multiprogramming; it evolved to mean multi-user interactive computing.

== Time-sharing ==
Time-sharing was first proposed in the mid- to late-1950s and first implemented in the early 1960s. The concept was born out of the realization that a single expensive computer could be efficiently utilized by enabling multiprogramming, and, later, by allowing multiple users simultaneous interactive access. Years later Christopher Strachey wrote he considered the change in the meaning of the term time-sharing to be a source of confusion and not what he meant when he wrote his original paper in 1959.

Without time-sharing, an individual user would enter bursts of information followed by long pauses; but with a group of users working at the same time, the pauses of one user would be filled by the activity of the others. Similarly, small slices of time spent waiting for disk, tape, or network input could be granted to other users. Given an optimal group size, the overall process could be very efficient. (Note: Application of this concept to data communication led Donald Davies to the idea of packet switching after seminar he gave on time-sharing in the Autumn of 1965, attended by several people working on Project MAC at MIT.)

Each user would use their own computer terminal, initially electromechanical teleprinters such as the Teletype Model 33 ASR or the Friden Flexowriter; from about 1970 these were progressively superseded by CRT-based units such as the DEC VT05, Datapoint 2200 and Lear Siegler ADM-3A.

Terminals were initially linked to a nearby computer via current loop or serial cables, by conventional telegraph circuits provided by PTTs and over specialist digital leased lines such T1. Modems such as the Bell 103 and successors, allowed remote and higher-speed use over the analogue voice telephone network.

== Family tree of major systems ==
See details and additional systems in the table below. Relationships shown here are for the purpose of grouping entries and do not reflect all influences. The Cambridge Multiple-Access System was the first time-sharing system developed outside the United States.

Family tree of major time-sharing operating system families Influences: ⇶ derivation ⇉ strong influence → some influence/precedence
CTSS →
CTSS →	•IBM mainframes:
CTSS →	CP-40/CMS ⇶ CP[-67]/CMS ⇶	VM/370 ⇶ VM/SE versions ⇶ VM/SP versions ⇶ VM/XA versions ⇶ VM/ESA ⇶ z/VM
CTSS →	CP-40/CMS ⇶ CP[-67]/CMS ⇶	VP/CSS
CTSS →	TSS/360
CTSS →	OS/360 MVT-TSO ⇶ OS/VS2 SVS-TSO ⇶ MVS-TSO ⇶ OS/390-TSO ⇶ z/OS-TSO
CTSS →	Transactional systems: CICS, TPF ⇶ z/TPF
CTSS →	•IBM mainframes with non-IBM operating systems:
CTSS →	Michigan Terminal System (MTS)
CTSS →	MUSIC/SP
CTSS →	ORVYL
CTSS →	•GE/Honeywell systems:
CTSS →	Dartmouth Time-Sharing System (DTSS)
CTSS →	MULTICS → UNIX family — see also UNIX; MULTICS → PRIMOS → Domain/OS; MULTICS ⇉ Stratus VOS
CTSS →	•DEC systems:
CTSS →	BBN Time-Sharing System
CTSS →	TOPS-10 → TENEX ⇉ TOPS-20
CTSS →	RSTS/E
CTSS →	RSX-11M ⇉ VMS ⇶ MICA
CTSS →	Incompatible Timesharing System (ITS)
CTSS →	•UNIX:
CTSS →	UNIX family ⇉ Linux

== System descriptions and relationships ==
Important time-sharing systems, 1960–1990 (and successors); listed alphabetically
Influences: ⇶ derivation ⇉ strong influence → some influence/precedence
System	Platform	Dates in use	Developer	Description	Influences: from→ →to
ACP	S/360 and S/370	1965–1979	IBM	High-performance mainframe transaction platform used in SABRE and PARS	⇶ TPF ⇶ z/TPF
APL ("A Programming Language," also "Iverson's Language")	System/360, others later	1964–present	Kenneth Iverson	Mathematically oriented language and interactive environment, noted for incredible terseness and powerful set processing operators	
Berkeley Timesharing System	SDS 940	1964–1972	Project Genie	Early general-purpose	⇉ TENEX
Cambridge Multiple-Access System	Titan, the prototype Atlas 2	1967–1973	University of Cambridge and Ferranti	Multiple Access System	Project MAC⇶ ⇶UNIX
CANDE	Burroughs Large Systems, Burroughs Medium Systems	1965?–present	Burroughs	first IDE	(separate evolution)
CICS	S/3x0	1969–present	IBM	Ubiquitous mainframe transaction platform; often used with IBM 3270 terminals and COBOL	
CP-40/CMS	customized S/360-40	1967–1972?	IBM's Cambridge Scientific Center	First implementation of full virtualization	CTSS→ ⇶ CP-67
CP-67/CMS	IBM System/360-67	1967–1975?	IBM's Cambridge Scientific Center	Influential precursor to IBM's VM series, widely distributed as open source	CP-40 ⇶ ⇶ VP/CSS ⇶ VM/370 ⇶ z/VM
CTSS ("Compatible Time Sharing System")	modified IBM 7090 and modified IBM 7094	1961–1973	MIT Computation Center	First-generation "grandfather" of time-sharing systems	FMS→ ⇉ CP-40 ⇉ Multics ⇉ ITS → [numerous other systems]
DTSS ("Dartmouth Time Sharing System")	GE 200, GE 635, Honeywell 6000 series	1963–1999	Dartmouth College	Early time-sharing system running Dartmouth BASIC and other tools; became the first commercial time-sharing system through General Electric Information Services Division	FMS→ ⇉ CP-40 ⇉ Multics ⇉ ITS → [numerous other systems]
ITS ("Incompatible Timesharing System")	PDP-6, PDP-10	1967–1990	MIT Artificial Intelligence Laboratory	"Subversive" operating system developed to counter direction of CTSS. The original platform for Macsyma, EMACS and other important applications.	CTSS→ → [numerous later systems]
JOSS ("JOHNNIAC Open Shop System")	JOHNNIAC, PDP-6	1963–1971?	RAND Corporation	Lightweight, interactive computing language for non-specialists; did not distinguish operating system from language	Highly regarded, but no obvious successors
Linux	ubiquitous	1991–present	Linus Torvalds, GNU project, open source	Operating system dominating current open source activities	UNIX ⇉ minix ⇉ → [numerous other systems]
Microsoft Windows (Remote Desktop Services)	x86, IA-64, others	1985–present	Microsoft	Ubiquitous GUI operating system	MS-DOS ⇉ OS/2 ⇉ VMS ⇉ MICA ⇉ Smalltalk ⇉
MTS (Michigan Terminal System)	IBM S/360-67, S/370	1967–1999	University of Michigan and 7 other universities	First (Nov. 1967) OS to use the virtual memory features of the S/360-67. Early (Sept. 1968) S/360-67 multiprocessor support.	CTSS→ DTSS→ → UNIX (BSD)
Multics	GE 645, Honeywell 6180	1969–2000	Project MAC	Rich, important system	CTSS ⇉ ⇉ UNIX ⇉ [many other systems]
MVS/TSO	System/370 and successors	1971–present	IBM	Probably the most widely used version of TSO, extended version TSO/E, current version zOS-TSO	CTSS→ TSS/360→ ⇶ z/OS-TSO
NOS	CDC 60-bit platforms	1976-??	Control Data Corporation	System used on most CDC machines	MACE→⇶ Kronos ⇉
NOS/BE	CDC 60-bit platforms	1976-??	Control Data Corporation	System used on most CDC machines	COS ⇶ SCOPE →⇶
ORVYL	IBM System/360 Model 67, IBM System/370, and successors	1967-??	Stanford University	Early time-sharing system; source of the WYLBUR editor later used on System/370 platforms	
OS/2 (as Citrix Multiuser)	x86	1987–present	IBM/Microsoft	Joint OS effort, now moribund. Still available as eComStation and ArcaOS.	DOS ⇶ Microsoft Windows ⇉ OS/2 ⇶ eComStation ⇶ ArcaOS 5.0
ROSCOE	System/360 and successors	1969–present	Applied Data Research (ADR)	Early time-sharing editor environment, often used as an alternative to TSO	⇶ WRAP
RSTS/E	PDP-11	1972–1992+	DEC	General-purpose time-sharing for the PDP-11	
RSX-11	PDP-11	1972-??	DEC	Real-time operating system for the PDP-11	⇶ IAS ⇉ VMS
Smalltalk	Xerox Alto, later made portable	1972–present	Xerox PARC, successors	Seminal system for experimental programming, responsible for many modern user interface concepts	⇉ Apple Lisa ⇉ Apple Macintosh ⇉ Microsoft Windows ⇉ [all GUI platforms]
Stratus VOS	i860, x86, PA-RISC, 68k	1980?–present	Stratus Technologies	High-availability fault-tolerant transaction processing	MULTICS ⇉
TENEX	PDP-10	1970?-??	Bolt Beranek and Newman	Influential system widely used at research and government sites	⇉ TOPS-20 ⇉ VMS
TOPS-10	PDP-10	1970–1988? (as TOPS-10); 1964–1970 (as PDP-6 Monitor)	DEC	Widely used at research and academic sites	PDP-6 Monitor ⇶ → TENEX ⇉ CP/M
TOPS-20	DECsystem 20	1976-??	DEC	Successor to TOPS-10 but more like TENEX	TENEX→ TOPS-10→
TPF	S/3x0	1979–present (TPF); 2005–present(z/TPF)	IBM	High-performance mainframe transaction platform, successor to ACP, still available as z/TPF	ACP ⇶ ⇶ z/TPF
TSOS	RCA Spectra 70 and successors	1968-today	RCA	Early general purpose mainframe OS	
TSS-8	PDP-8	1967–??	DEC	Simple minicomputer OS	→ RSTS/E
TSS/360; TSS/370	IBM System/360-67 and successors	1967–1971?	IBM	IBM's original "official" time-sharing system; not a success	CTSS→ ⇶ TSS/370
Unisys/UNIVAC EXEC 8	UNIVAC 1108 and successors	1964–present	Sperry-Rand et al.	Many universities and government agencies were early users	EXEC 8 ⇶ OS 1100 ⇶ OS 2200
UNIX and derivative systems	ubiquitous	1969–present	Bell Laboratories and successors	Ultimately dominated operating system thought, in both proprietary and open-source descendants	Multics ⇉ ⇉ Linux
VM/370; VM/SE; VM/SP	System/370 and successors	1972–1988; 2000–present (z/VM)	IBM	Proprietary reimplementation of CP/CMS, still available as z/VM	CP-40 ⇶ CP-67 ⇶ ⇶ VM/ESA ⇶ z/VM
OpenVMS	VAX, IA-64, DEC Alpha, x86-64	1977–present	DEC	Popular DEC operating system	TENEX→ RSX-11M ⇉ ⇉ MICA ⇉ Windows NT
VP/CSS	IBM System/360-67, System/370 and successors	1968–1986?	National CSS	Proprietary fork of CP/CMS developed by a time-sharing vendor	CP/CMS ⇶
WYLBUR	System/370 and successors	1967–2009?	Stanford University	Popular editor system originally from ORVYL, used under OS/VS as an alternative to TSO	⇶ SuperWylbur

== See also ==
- History of CP/CMS has many period details and sources.
- Timeline of operating systems
