= Robert Creasy =

American computer scientist

Robert Jay Creasy (November 15, 1939 – August 11, 2005) was the project leader of the first full virtualization hypervisor, the IBM CP-40, which later developed into IBM's highly successful line of mainframe VM operating systems.

== Biography ==
Robert J. Creasy was born on November 15, 1939, in Honesdale, Pennsylvania. He graduated from MIT in 1961, marrying Rosalind Reeves that year. After graduation, he worked as a programmer on the CTSS timesharing system and on Project MAC. Disappointed with the direction of MAC, when he heard that Norm Rasmussen, Manager of IBM's Cambridge Scientific Center, intended to build a time sharing system based on IBM's System/360 and needed someone to lead the project, Creasy left MIT to join IBM.

Robert and Rosalind moved to California in 1965.

He retired from IBM's Scientific Center in Palo Alto in 1993.

He died on August 11, 2005, in Pioneer, California, survived by his wife, Rosalind, son Robert W. and wife Julie; daughter, Laura and husband Joel; grandson, Joel Alexander; brother, John and wife Kathy, and other relatives.

== Origins of VM ==
In the fall of 1964, the future development of time sharing was problematical. IBM had lost the Project MAC contract to GE, leading to the development of Multics. IBM itself had committed to a time sharing system known as TSS. At the IBM Cambridge Scientific Center, Manager Norm Rasmussen was concerned that IBM was heading in the wrong direction. He decided to proceed with his own plan to build a timesharing system, with Bob Creasy leading what became known as the CP-40 Project.

Creasy had decided to build CP-40 while riding on the MTA. “I launched the effort between Xmas 1964 and year’s end, after making the decision while on an MTA bus from Arlington to Cambridge. It was a Tuesday, I believe.” (R.J. Creasy, private communication with Melinda Varian, 1989.)

Creasy and Les Comeau spent the last week of 1964 joyfully brainstorming the design of CP-40, a new kind of operating system, a system that would provide not only virtual memory, but also virtual machines. They had seen that the cleanest way to protect users from one another (and to preserve compatibility as the new System/360 design evolved) was to use the System/360 Principles of Operations manual to describe the user's interface to the Control Program. Each user would have a complete System/360 virtual machine (which at first was called a “pseudo-machine”).

The idea of a virtual machine system had been bruited about a bit before then, but it had never really been implemented. The idea of a virtual S/360 was new, but what was really important about their concept was that nobody until then had seen how elegantly a virtual machine system could be built, with really very minor hardware changes and not much software.

Back during that last week of 1964, when they were working out the design for the Control Program, Creasy and Comeau immediately recognized that they would need a second system, a console monitor system, to run in some of their virtual machines. Although they knew that with a bit of work they would be able to run any of IBM's S/360 operating systems in a virtual machine, as contented users of CTSS they also knew that they wouldn't be satisfied using any of the available systems for their own development work or for the Center's other time-sharing requirements. Rasmussen, therefore, set up another small group under Creasy to build CMS (which was then called the “Cambridge Monitor System”).

Like Multics, CMS would draw heavily on the lessons taught by CTSS. Indeed, the CMS user interface would be very much like that of CTSS.

The combination of CP-40 and CMS evolved into CP/CMS which was made available to IBM customers in 1967. In 1972, a revised version was released as IBM's VM/370 product.
