= National CSS =

Defunct American computer time-sharing firm

National CSS, Inc. (NCSS) was a time-sharing firm in the 1960–80s, until its acquisition by Dun & Bradstreet in 1979 in a deal valued at $170 million. NCSS was originally headquartered in Norwalk, Connecticut, but relocated to Wilton in 1978. Sales offices, data centers, and development facilities were located at various sites throughout the U.S. Some additional sales offices were active in the UK and elsewhere.

== Early history ==
The firm began life in 1966 as Computer Software Systems, a consulting firm headed by Bob Bernard. In 1967, joined by Dick Orenstein (one of the authors of CTSS), the company began exploring the idea of offering time-sharing services based on CP/CMS. After IBM released CP/CMS under the IBM Type-III Library in 1968, and thus became available to CSS, this dream became possible. The small firm persuaded IBM to take an order for a S/360-67, and key technical people were recruited. The machine was delivered in November 1968. Harold Feinleib, an early recruit from MIT, describes the situation:

I couldn’t imagine what the IBM people must have been thinking. This machine cost close to $100K a month to rent so I am sure they were quite concerned to accept the order from a couple of young guys. Even most big companies didn’t have machines this powerful. This was their latest technology and we were one of the first to order one.

By December 1968, the firm was reselling time. Needing more capital to expand, the company went public in 1970, changing its name to "National CSS" (because "CSS" was not available nationwide). After a couple of hard years, business took off in the mid 70s.

== Products ==
NCSS was best known for two products: the VP/CSS operating system, and the NOMAD database system.

- VP/CSS was derived from a copy of CP/CMS, but these systems diverged considerably over the following 10–15 years. VP/CSS initially ran on the IBM System/360-67; it was ported to the System/370 series after IBM added virtual memory to these machines in 1972. Through extensive in-house software development, VP/CSS enabled NCSS's profitable resale of interactive computer time, which began in December 1968. Robust performance, and a suite of interactive development tools, attracted the interest of clients previously shackled by traditional in-house punched card/batch operations and unsupportive technicians. VP/CSS earned a reputation for capacity and efficiency.
- NOMAD was another project led by Feinlieb and was built to exploit the NCSS market position. The young company delivered an interactive database management environment based on relational database theory, a new concept of the day. NOMAD was primarily sold to meet end-user and ad hoc needs, such as sales analysis and financial modeling – needs that were often unmet by the corporate ADP/MIS groups of the time period.

When NCSS began selling remote access to its computers, it was selling to an industry where in-house programmers did their development via batch processing on punched cards. Feinleib describes their early appeal:

In those days, COBOL programmers could get one or possibly two turnarounds a day because their in-house machines were used for production work most of the time. They worked with punched cards, so any slight error would waste a run and a whole day. On our system, which used the same IBM COBOL compiler, they could get dozens of turnarounds a day. They would use an IBM Selectric Typewriter terminal to edit and enter their program, and then they could run and debug it. We enabled them to put in test data and even added a symbolic debugger so they could debug their programs interactively. This program development service sold like hot-cakes

Later, as time-sharing became available in more development shops, the NCSS customer base gradually shifted to a larger proportion of end-users who were trying to solve information problems without using their in-house MIS departments. By the late 1970s, the main source of NCSS business growth was its NOMAD product, well-suited for such users.

At the time of the D&B acquisition, a follow-on technology was under development that would merge advanced operating system and database concepts. The project was abandoned as unsuccessful. Instead, in 1982, NOMAD was ported to IBM's VM/370 operating system as NOMAD2, in conjunction with major customer Bank of America, and soon VP/CSS was also abandoned.

== Clients ==
NCSS achieved major successes with large banks, oil companies, pharmaceutical firms, and manufacturers, as well as many smaller clients. Important application areas included database publishing, financial analysis/modeling, engineering, sales analysis, bill-of-materials processing, statistics/crosstabulation, mailing list administration, patent management, and interactive software development.

== Connectivity ==
Most customers connected to the NCSS system using dial-up terminals and modems: 110 or 300 baud was typical for the early years; 1200 baud became more common after the mid-70s. Some customers installed conditioned telephone circuits for constant higher-speed access.

A nationwide packet-switched network, running primarily on DEC PDP-11s, provided access between modem banks and up to a dozen large IBM and Amdahl mainframes. This network also provided interconnections between mainframes.

Various distributed applications at NCSS pioneered early implementations of teleconferencing, inter-user messaging, client/server database processing (before commercial SQL systems existed), and file sharing, both on a single machine and between machines. (An interprocess communication interface, for example, was implemented providing transparent read/write access between remote applications – using normal file system I/O, analogous to a UNIX pipe. This let applications on different mainframes exchange data without the need for any software modification.)

== Services ==
The nature of computer time-sharing was that a dissatisfied customer could always "hang up the phone". This put great pressure on time-sharing vendors to provide attractive levels of performance and support. Hardware vendors of the day saw different priorities; they did not focus on consistent day-to-day support. Likewise, the in-house systems groups responsible for mainstream data processing were often seen as unresponsive by their end users.

Feinleib relates a story about NCSS customer support, and how a problem at Bell Labs was resolved:

One day something happened to the disk they had their files on. It was a hardware failure. Now that wasn’t a problem because we did routine backups of all our customer files. Except, for some reason we didn’t backup Bell Labs files.... [I told the salesman to] tell them exactly what happened – that we screwed up and didn’t back up their files. Explain how it happened and then say that we will do anything to help them get their data back. He sucked in his gut and did it. After the initial shock, the folks at Bell Labs rolled up their sleeves with us and gathered stacks and stacks of printouts that we used to get their data keypunched, which we reloaded into the system. The way we handled this problem so impressed Bell Labs that they went on to become a much larger customer than ever before.... [Customers understand] that technology is fragile, and having confidence in their vendor relationship is the most important thing.

In this climate, NCSS built a strong support and consulting organization, able to help end-users bypass their in-house technical resources. This organization allowed the NCSS sales force to ignore traditional data processing procurement routes; they could instead sell directly to line managers with discretionary budgets and revenue responsibility. Doing so flew in the face of the technology establishment, which had hitherto maintained tight control over all technical decisions. Empowered end users were now able to ask and answer their own questions, without having to deal with the intermediary of a Computer Science professional. This released many frustrations, and helped change expectations about the role of information technology. Agile companies exploited this situation, and out-competed their slower-paced rivals.

These changes fostered a transformation of business structures of the 80s and 90s, forcing technical resources to respond more directly to corporate and customer needs, and encouraging the creation of new user-centered methodologies (such as rapid prototyping and joint application design). End user access to interactive computer systems was a key step in this change.

The same users who used timesharing to outfox their MIS departments eventually became early adopters of PC technology. This shift ultimately marked the end of the timesharing industry – which was unable to exploit or even embrace the paradigm shift that it helped create.

== People ==
NCSS attracted an early technical team that included leading figures from MIT and the CP/CMS community; and they in turn attracted other strong hires. A major appeal at the time was that, aside from hardware vendors, NCSS was one of very few organizations doing large-scale in-house operating system development. Moreover, the firm's small size, high-profile clients, and rapidly changing application needs meant that an individual developer or support person was likely to encounter many different challenging problems each month. The NCSS diaspora of the late 70s and early 80s helped seed many successful R&D groups and products with independent thinkers. Robert E. Weissman, who led NCSS when Dun & Bradstreet acquired it, later became chairman of Dun & Bradstreet and, after D&B spun IMS Health off, chairman of IMS Health.

== Hacking ==
NCSS was the subject of a computer hacking incident. A New York Times article published 26 July 1981, by Vin McLellan, described the compromise of the NCSS master password and a follow-up investigation by the FBI. Although the security breach was extensive, there was no malicious intent or damage done. Instead, a Kilroy was here attitude got the hacker into trouble. The incident helped raise awareness about security issues in an industry that had been indifferent to such risks.

== See also ==
- CP/CMS
- History of CP/CMS
