= IBM M44/44X =

Experimental IBM mainframe from the 1960s

The IBM M44/44X was an experimental computer system from the mid-1960s, designed and operated at IBM's Thomas J. Watson Research Center at Yorktown Heights, New York. It was based on a modified IBM 7044 (the 'M44'), and simulated multiple 7044 virtual machines (the '44X'), using both hardware and software. Key team members were Dave Sayre and Rob Nelson. This was a groundbreaking machine, used to explore paging, the virtual machine concept, and computer performance measurement. It was purely a research system, and was cited in 1981 by Peter Denning as an outstanding example of experimental computer science.

The term virtual machine probably originated with the M44/44X project, from which it was later appropriated by the CP-40 team to replace their earlier term pseudo machine.

Unlike CP-40 and later CP/CMS control programs, M44/44X did not implement a complete simulation of the underlying hardware (i.e. full virtualization). CP-40 project leader Robert Creasy observed:

The M44/44X "was about as much of a virtual machine system as CTSS – which is to say that it was close enough to a virtual machine system to show that 'close enough' did not count. I never heard a more eloquent argument for virtual machines than from Dave Sayre."

M44/44X "implanted the idea that the virtual machine concept is not necessarily less efficient than more conventional approaches" – a core assumption in the CP/CMS architecture, and one that ultimately proved very successful.
