= Monolithic system =

System integrated into one whole

A monolithic system is a system that is integrated into one whole, analogous to a monolith. The phrase can have slightly different meanings in the contexts of computer software and hardware.

== In application software ==
In application software, software is called "monolithic" if it has a monolithic architecture, in which functionally distinguishable aspects (for example data input and output, data processing, error handling, and the user interface) are all interwoven, rather than containing architecturally separate components. Software systems like this are examples of monolithic applications.

== In hardware ==
An electronic hardware system, such as a multi-core processor, is called "monolithic" if its components are integrated together in a single integrated circuit. Note that such a system may consist of architecturally separate components – in a multi-core system, each core forms a separate component – as long as they are realized on a single die.

== In system software ==
In system software, a monolithic kernel is an operating system (OS) architecture where the entire OS is working in kernel space.
