= Terminal controller =

A terminal controller is a device that collects traffic from a set of terminals and directs them to a concentrator.
