= Interactive Data Corporation =

Financial services company (1968–2015)

ICE Data Services
- Company type: Private
- Traded as: NYSE: IDC
- Industry: Financial services
- Founded: 1968
- Headquarters: Bedford, Massachusetts, U.S.
- Key people: Mason Slaine (Chairman); Stephen Daffron (President and CEO); Jay Nadler (COO)
- Owner: Intercontinental Exchange
- Number of employees: approx. 2,500 worldwide

ICE Data Services, formerly known as Interactive Data or Interactive Data Corporation (IDC), was an American financial data vendor that provided market data, analytics and related solutions to financial institutions, active traders and individual investors. Initially founded in 1968 as a time-sharing services company, IDC went on to supply real-time market data, time-sensitive pricing, evaluations and reference data for securities trading, including hard-to-value instruments. The company was acquired by and folded into Intercontinental Exchange in December 2015.

== Products ==
Interactive Data provided evaluation services, reference data, pricing services, derivatives services, Fair Value Information Services, low latency market data, trading infrastructure services, fixed income analytics, Web-based solutions, desktop solutions, the eSignal suite of products, and environmental, social and corporate governance (ESG) data including quantitative ESG risk indicators for individual companies and sectors (current figures as well as historical data for the past two years) provided by RepRisk, a global business intelligence provider specialized in ESG risk analytics and metrics.

== History ==
=== Timesharing services ===
Founded in 1968 as a Waltham, Massachusetts-based time-sharing company, Interactive Data Corporation was acquired by Chase Manhattan Bank in 1974.

Like competitor National CSS (NCSS), their time-sharing service was based on IBM's CP/CMS Time-sharing software for the IBM System 360 Model 67. IDC focused on the financial industry, while NCSS had a broader client base.

In 1984, Chase expanded IDC by purchasing Western Union's Telstat Systems division.

=== Data services ===
In 2002 Interactive bought Merrill Lynch's securities pricing service.

Interactive Data became known as a supplier of financial market data and related offerings, "including data bases used for economic forecasting." Acquisitions have contributed to Interactive Data's growth, enabling the company to deliver an increasing range of services, while expanding into adjacent markets and extending its reach geographically.

Later on, Pearson PLC owned 61% of the company. In 2010 the company announced the completion of its acquisition by two private equity firms, Warburg Pincus and Silver Lake Partners.

In 2015, Intercontinental Exchange announced the acquisition of Interactive Data Corporation from Warburg Pincus and Silver Lake Partners.
