= IBM Type-III Library =

The IBM Type-III Library (also: Type-III software, Type-III product) was software provided by IBM to its customers, available without charge, liability, or support, and typically (perhaps always) in source-code format. The best known examples are for mainframe software, but IBM also used this same classification on smaller systems.

IBM also distributed other systems in source code form. Most early operating systems were shipped in this way. Source distribution of the VM family of operating systems continued for several decades after it supplanted CP/CMS from the Type-III Library, and TPF was always distributed in source form, apparently continued today with z/TPF. Unlike Type-III software, such systems were supported by IBM.

== Scope of the IBM Program Libraries ==
During the mainframe era, IBM made a wide variety of programs available to its customers. Programs were offered in two broad categories. The first category of programs were IBM developed and supported. These were termed Type I (Programming systems) and Type II (Application Programs). These programs were subjected to formal testing and were maintained by IBM.

The second category of available programs were termed Type III and Type IV programs. Type III (IBM Contributed Programs) and Type IV (Customer Contributed Programs) were programs of general interest contributed to the Program Information Department (PID) for distribution. These programs and their documents were distributed in the author's original form and were not subjected to any formal testing.

These libraries were maintained by the IBM Program Information Department, headquartered in Hawthorne, New York, with its distribution center in Mechanicsburg, Pennsylvania, which published separate catalogs for each compatible family of IBM Processors.

- An IBM publication on CP/CMS characterized IBM's Type-III products as "IBM employee contributed" and further characterized them as follows:

[The software] has not been submitted to any formal test. Type III Programs are provided by the IBM Corporation as part of its service to customers, but recipients are expected to make the final evaluation as to the usefulness of the programs in their own environment. There is no committed maintenance for Type III Programs, nor does IBM make any warranty, expressed or implied, as to the documentation, function or performance of such programs.

Originally, these programs were not individually priced, but were provided at no cost as part of IBM’s service. In 1969, IBM “unbundled,” separately pricing hardware, software, and services. The Type-III library was eventually replaced by several different product designations. Programs contributed by customers were known as "Installed User Programs" (IUPs) and those developed by IBM employees as "Field Developed Programs" (FDPs). The "field developed" moniker was something of a misnomer, as quite a few FDPs were written by employees in the IBM programming groups rather than by field personnel.

== Products ==
Some of the many Type-III programs offered by IBM include:

- 1961: General Purpose Simulation System (GPSS)
- 1968: APL programming language for the IBM 1130 and System/360 computers
- May 1968: CP/CMS
- Houston Automatic Spooling Priority (HASP)
- JOVIAL compiler
- August 1969: Conversational Programming System (CPS)
