= Z/VM =

Computer operating system

z/VM
- Developer: IBM
- OS family: VM family
- Working state: Current
- Source model: Closed source
- Latest release: 7.5 / September 18, 2026; 15 days ago
- License: Proprietary
- Official website: www.ibm.com/products/zvm

z/VM is the current version in IBM's VM family of virtual machine operating systems. First released in October 2000, z/VM remains in active use and development as of 2024. It is directly based on technology and concepts dating back to the 1960s, particularly IBM's CP/CMS on the IBM System/360-67 (see article History of CP/CMS for historical details). z/VM runs on IBM's IBM Z family of computers and can support large numbers (thousands) of Linux virtual machines. (See Linux on IBM Z.)

On 16 September 2022, IBM released z/VM Version 7.3 which requires z/Architecture, implemented since IBM's EC12, BC12 and later models.

== See also ==
- OpenSolaris for System z
- PR/SM
- Time-sharing system evolution
- z/OS
- z/TPF
- z/VSE
