= Cambridge Scientific Center =

Research laboratory in Massachusetts, US

The IBM Cambridge Scientific Center was a corporate research laboratory established in February 1964 in Cambridge, Massachusetts. Situated at 545 Technology Square (Tech Square), in the same building as MIT's Project MAC, it was later renamed the IBM Scientific Center. It is most notable for creating the CP-40 and the control program portions of CP/CMS, a virtual machine operating system developed for the IBM System/360-67.

== History ==
The IBM Data Processing Division (DPD) sponsored five Scientific Center research groups in the United States and some others around the world to work with selected universities on a variety of customer-related projects.

The IBM Research Division in Yorktown Heights, NY was a separate laboratory organization at the Thomas J. Watson Research Center that tended more to "pure" research topics. The DPD Scientific Centers in the late 1960s were located in Palo Alto, California, Houston, Texas, Washington, D.C., Philadelphia, Pennsylvania, Cambridge, Massachusetts, and Grenoble, France. The IBM Time-Life Programming Center in Manhattan, New York worked with the scientific centers but had a slightly different reporting line.

Established by Norm Rasmussen, the Cambridge Scientific Center worked with computing groups at both MIT and Harvard, in the same building as Project MAC and the IBM Boston Programming Center (BPC). Additional joint projects involved the MIT Lincoln Laboratory on the outskirts of Boston and Brown University in Providence, RI.

The scientific center in 1969 had three main departments: Computer Graphics under Craig Johnson, Operations Research under John Harmon, and Operating Systems under Richard (Rip) Parmelee.

In December 1975 Richard MacKinnon became director of the center, succeeding Dr. William Timlake who, in turn, had succeeded Rasmussen. As the third director, MacKinnon was to serve as its longest-tenured director. During his tenure, Cambridge Scientific Center was responsible for a number of enhancements to the VM/370 operating system which became IBM's most popular interactive computing system. These included: an enhanced scheduler for the operating system based on the work of Lynn Wheeler; the VNET networking capability based upon the work of Edson Hendricks and Tim Hartman; multiprocessor support for the IBM asymmetric MPs, led by Howard Holley; IBM's first UNIX system under VM for the National Security Agency; a remote operations capability for VM led by Love Seawright and David Boloker and done in conjunction with the University of Maine, Orono {and which spread throughout IBM's processor lines}; a special controller which allowed ASCII terminals to access VM {done in conjunction with Yale university Comp Center and its director, Greydon Freeman}; and the ASCII software support for the IBM PC which allowed PCs to access IBM and many other non-IBM mainframes {the work of Jim Perchik}. The VNET networking software became the basis for IBM's internal corporate data network {which had over 3,000 IBM processor nodes} and the university BITNET network which was facilitated by Cambridge in conjunction with Yale Computer Center {Greydon Freeman} and CUNY computer center {Ira Fuchs}. MacKinnon served at Cambridge for 18 years and in July 1992 had the unenviable responsibility of closing CSC when IBM decided to close all its scientific centers worldwide.

IBM closed the center on July 31, 1992.

== Selected publications ==
R. J. Adair, R. U. Bayles, L. W. Comeau, and R. J. Creasy, "A Virtual Machine System for the 360/40," IBM Corporation, Cambridge Scientific Center, Report No. 320-2007 (May 1966).

R. A. Meyer and L. H. Seawright, "A Virtual Machine Timesharing System," IBM Systems Journal 9, No.3, 199-218 (1970).

R. P. Parmelee, T. L. Peterson, C. C. Tillman, and D. J. Hatfield, "Virtual Storage and Virtual Machine Concepts," IBM Systems Journal 11, No.2, 99-130 (1972).

E. C. Hendricks and T. C. Hartmann, "Evolution of a Virtual Machine Subsystem," IBM Systems Journal 18, No.1, 111-142 (1979).

L. H. Holley, R. P. Parmelee, C. A. Salisbury, and D. N. Saul, "VM/370 Asymmetric Multiprocessing," IBM Systems Journal 18, No.1, 47-70 (1979).

L. H. Seawright and R. A. MacKinnon, "VM/370 - A Study of Multiplicity and Usefulness," IBM Systems Journal 18, No. 1, 4-17 (1979).

R. J. Creasy, "The Origin of the VM/370 Time-Sharing System," IBM Journal of Research and Development 25, No.5, 483-490 (September 1981).

F. T. Kozuh, D. L. Livingston, and T. C. Spillman, "System/370 Capability in a Desktop Computer," IBM Systems Journal 23, No.3, 245-254 (1984).

Y. Bard, "The VM Performance Planning Facility (VMPPF)," Computer Measurement Group (CMG) Transactions 53, 53- 59 (Summer 1986).

== See also ==
- IBM Research
