= IBM Basic Programming Support =

Computer programs for mainframes

IBM Basic Programming Support/360 (BPS), originally called Special Support, was a set of standalone programs for System/360 mainframes with a minimum of 8 KiB of memory.

BPS was developed by IBM's General Products Division in Endicott, New York. The package included "assemblers, IOCS, compilers, sorts, and utilities but no governing control program." BPS components were introduced in a series of product announcements between 1964 and 1965.

BPS came in two versions — a strictly punched card system and a magnetic tape based system which, contrary to the stated goals, kept a small supervisor permanently resident.

Programming languages available were IBM Basic Assembly Language, IBM RPG, and FORTRAN IV (subset). Tape FORTRAN required 16 KiB of memory. There were also two versions of the BPS assembler, with the tape version having enhanced capabilities.

BPS also had a "disk" counterpart called BOS/360. It also required 8 KiB of memory and supported disks such as the IBM 2311.

The group responsible for BPS/BOS went on to develop DOS/360 and TOS/360 as a supposed "interim" solution when it became evident that OS/360 would be too large to run on 16 KiB systems.

BPS and BOS could be used to run standalone applications on a minimal System/360. One application was the System/360 Work Station for remote job entry to a larger system.

== See also ==
- Punched card input/output
