= ORVYL and WYLBUR =

Time-sharing monitor for IBM computers

- Developer: Stanford University
- Written in: 360/370 Assembly language
- Working state: Discontinued
- Source model: Originally Open source; the later proprietary versions had licensed source
- Initial release: 1967, 1968
- Available in: English
- Supported platforms: IBM S/360, S/370, and successors
- License: Originally public domain; the later proprietary versions had distinct licenses
- Official website: web.stanford.edu/dept/its/support/wylorv/

ORVYL is a time-sharing monitor developed by Stanford University for IBM System/360 and System/370 computers in 1967–68. ORVYL was one of the first time-sharing systems to be made available for IBM computers. Wylbur is a text editor and word processor program designed to work either without ORVYL, or in conjunction with ORVYL.

== Overview ==
The names ORVYL and WYLBUR are often used interchangeably, but:

- ORVYL is a timesharing monitor that supports a file system, command language, program execution and debugging, and provides supervisor services. The first version runs only on a 360/67, but later versions run on a System/370.
- WYLBUR is a text editor, word processor, (Note: Using its own markup language) job submission and retrieval, and e-mail program designed to work in conjunction with ORVYL or with IBM's OS/360, SVS, and MVS operating systems.
- MILTEN is terminal control software used by both ORVYL and WYLBUR for start/stop terminals.

WYLBUR is not a full standalone operating system in the mold of Dartmouth Time-Sharing System (DTSS) or Unix. Instead it runs on top of an IBM batch operating system (OS/360, SVS, MVS). It takes the form of an editor with a Remote Job Entry system and thus has much the same relationship to the IBM operating systems as Emacs does to Unix. For these reasons WYLBUR is often thought of as a text editor rather than a time-sharing system. However, whereas Unix does not need Emacs to provide text editing services, IBM's operating systems originally needed WYLBUR. Later innovations such as IBM's Administrative Terminal System (ATS), Conversational Remote Batch Entry (CRBE), Conversational Remote Job Entry (CRJE) and Time Sharing Option (TSO) made WYLBUR less relevant for IBM users and gradually replaced it.

This article will use the full upper case spelling for commands and keywords. All references to characters and string assume an EBCDIC code page.

== Use ==
ORVYL and WYLBUR were used at the Stanford Linear Accelerator Center (SLAC), the European Organization for Nuclear Research (CERN), the U.S. National Institutes of Health (NIH), and many other sites. Retired from most sites in the late 1990s owing to concerns about Y2K issues, they remained in use at NIH until December 2009. ORVYL and WYLBUR are still available as open source from Stanford. There are also proprietary versions such as SuperWYlbur.

ORVYL and WYLBUR were much admired as shown by this excerpt from a 2004 article titled "Computing at CERN: the mainframe era":

[In 1976 the IBM S/370-168] also brought with it the MVS (Multiple Virtual Storage) operating system, with its pedantic Job Control Language, and it provided the opportunity for CERN to introduce WYLBUR, the well-loved, cleverly designed and friendly time-sharing system developed at SLAC, together with its beautifully handwritten and illustrated manual by John Ehrman. WYLBUR was a masterpiece of design, achieving miracles with little power (at the time) shared amongst many simultaneous users. It won friends with its accommodating character and began the exit of punch-card machinery as computer terminals were introduced across the lab.

== Advantages and disadvantages ==
ORVYL and WYLBUR first became available in 1967–68, before TSS/360, TSO, or any other official time-sharing solution from IBM. This was roughly the same time that third-party time-sharing systems such as MTS became available and the under the radar development effort of CP-67 at IBM's own Cambridge Scientific Center took place. WYLBUR had the additional advantage that it could be used in conjunction with IBM's mainstream operating system, OS/360..

WYLBUR is a single-address-space system, unlike TSO. This conserved memory in the days when memory was precious. So even when TSO was available, organizations seeking to minimize memory use would often keep some or even a majority of their users on WYLBUR rather than letting them use the TSO interactive environment.

WYLBUR provides compressed Partitioned Data Sets (PDSs, a.k.a. libraries) to save disk space. In MVS, source code is typically stored as a sequence of card images (80 character lines). If a line contained only one or just a few characters, 80 characters were still used to store that line. Even when data, e.g., source code, are stored as variable blocked (VB), space could be wasted on strings of embedded blanks. WYLBUR implements stream-oriented storage of text in PDSs, (and sequential data sets) so that a one character line might only take 16 characters (line length, offset, chunk length, character) rather than 80 to store. WYLBUR, or an external program run via JCL, was used to convert files to and from the WYLBUR EDIT format.

Although TSO allows a user to do more than a locked-down WYLBUR system did, it is possible to write WYLBUR Exec scripts that execute batch jobs to perform functions that ordinarily would have required a TSO account, filling a batch job skeleton out with parameters, submitting the batch job, retrieving the output and displaying it on the screen.

WYLBUR has some security advantages over TSO, and some disadvantages. Advantages include:

- Being able to write rules to restrict user access to datasets other than those owned by them and stored under their prefix. This is analogous to a user's home directory on UNIX, and looks something like WYL.AV99.HCO, where AV99 is roughly analogous to the "group" and HCO the "user" within the group.
- Being fairer about resource use. WYLBUR doesn't implement commands such as TSO's alloc which can intentionally or unintentionally prevent others' access to data files for an extended period of time or use tremendous amounts of memory or CPU time. In this way, it minimizes the impact of any single user on all other users.
- Commands to set certain status parameters or "spy" on the commands being executed by other users were restricted to administrative users and could not be executed by regular users.

Disadvantages related to security included:

- WYLBUR is a single-address-space system. That means that if a user can figure out how to access raw bytes in the address space, they can potentially access information they do not own. For example, there once existed a program written by two college students in the WYLBUR Exec scripting language which could dig the password of the most recently logged on user out of WYLBUR's memory.
- Because the WYLBUR process runs under the system account assigned to WYLBUR, one is completely dependent on its enforcement of dataset access protections according to the rules set up in WYLBUR. Enforcement of the access rules could be completely disabled by an administrative user, for system maintenance purposes, who might not remember to re-enable them.
- WYLBUR implements disk quotas, with an interesting twist: any system user could give away all or part of their quota to other users. This functionality could be combined with typical course-related student accounts that went away at the end of every semester, and computer-savvy student staff who had non-expiring accounts with low disk quotas, in a manner not always anticipated by university staff.
- In systems running the ACF2 security package, a user with accounts in both TSO and WYLBUR that are tied to the same account name could reset the contents of their WYLBUR account's security record interactively from within TSO. This could be used to turn a regular WYLBUR user into an administrative WYLBUR user, increase its disk quota, etc.
- At least through the 1960s, the WYLBUR security rules were not enforced for batch jobs running on the same system. So, utilities such as IEHLIST and IEBGENER could be used to discover, read, and modify files belonging to other WYLBUR users unless you password protected those files, which was operationally awkward.

== Data Management ==
Wylbur had a special edit format for Wylbur data sets, which are compressed and have a line number and revision flag for each line. In addition Wylbur supports standard FB and VB datasets. A Wylbur user normally specifies a default volume, which may be the special word CATLG. requesting a search of the catalogue for an existing dataset and requesting that a new dataset be cataloged. Wylbur has the ability to convert line numbers between edit and IBM data sets, either as scaled integers or with an explicit decimal point.

== Editing ==
Wylbur provides a line editor that works with temporary data sets, similar to buffers in other editors. At any point in time one of the temporary data sets is designated as default. Wylbur maintains a current line pointer for each temporary data set. The user may specify an explicit working data set on a command; if he omits it, then the default temporary data set is used as the working data set.

The unit of operation is a set of lines (associative range) and individual lines are identified with a line number in the range 0.0 to 99999.999; leading zeros in the integer part and trailing zeros in the fractional part may be omitted. The user can specify a line number in any of the following ways

1. Absolute line number: ddddd.ddd
2. FIRST: first line in the working data set
3. CURRENT: the current line for the working data set
4. LAST: last line in the working data set
5. END: a target for copies, following the last line in the working data set
6. relative: line+ordinal or line -ordinal.
7. macro variable containing a line

Wylbur libraries have a nonstandard format, however it allows the user to export to native OS files with integer sequence numbers and to import native OS files with integer sequence and rescale the line number by a factor of 1000.

A range can be specified as a combination of

1. An explicit range, e.g., 5.3-2/7.4+3
2. A pattern, e.g., 'X' DIGITS*3
3. A pattern with a column range, e.g., 'BAL' 10/15
4. An ordinal, e.g., 3RD 'BAL' 10/15
5. An ordinal relative to a match, e.g., 3RD AFTER 'BAL' 10/15
6. A sequence of lines following a match, e.g., EVERY 3RD AFTER 'BAL' 10/15
7. A Boolean operation, e.g., 'PAGE' INTERSECTION COMPLEMENT 'NUMBER'
8. A specification in parentheses prefixed by SET, e.g., 'PAGE' INTERSECTION SET (COMPLEMENT 'NUMBER')

A pattern is similar to a regular expression, but the syntax is closer to that of SNOBOL than to that of Unix or Perl, there is no backtracking and only the NIH Wylbur has capture of subpatterns. A pattern may be:

- 'string'
- "string"
- pattern pattern
- (pattern)
- patern*digits
- pattern*digits/digits
- ABOVE 'string'
- pattern AND pattern
- ANY
- BACKSPACE
- BELOW 'string'
- BLANK
- BLANKS
- BOL
- BOS
- BULLET
- DASH
- DIGIT
- DIGITS
- ECB
  Equal, comma, blank
- ECBS
  Equals, commas, blanks
- EMPTY
- EOL
- EOS
- HEX [#]hexdigits
- LBRACKET
- LETTER
- LOWER
- NOT pattern
- pattern OR pattern
- PARAGRAPH
- PUNCTUATION
- RBRACKET
- SECTION
- SPACE
- SPACES
- SOME 'string'
- pattern THRU pattern
- UNPRINTABLE
- UPLOW 'string'
- UPPER

Sample commands

CHANGE 73/80 TO X10+10 IN EVERY 3RD LINE OF 'ABC' 1/3 in 1.5-2/3.7+2
COPY 'BAL' 10/15 TO EMD
CHANGE 73/80 TO '' IN EVERY 3RD LINE START 2 OF 'BAL' 10/15
CHANGE '(' DIGITS*3 ')' TO SUBSTRING 2/4

The specification of base+increment means that the replacement text on the first line is base and is incremented on subsequent lines, so that X10+10 replaces the matched text on the first line with X10, on the second line with X20 and on the third line with X30. The specification of SUBSTRING 2/4 means columns 2-4 of the matched string; note that this is less flexible than captures.

== Enhanced versions ==
Various organizations developed enhanced versions of Wylbur. These included

- National Institutes of Health
- Online Business Systems which was acquired by ACS (Affiliated Computer Services Inc).
- Optimum Systems Inc., sold to Electronic Data Systems and later spun off as SuperWylbur® Systems, Inc.
- RAND Corporation:
  - WYLBUR Command Facilities 1975
    - This manual describes two related facilities that extend WYLBUR in the direction of a programming language that supports structured text entry and text manipulation applications.
      1. The first facility is an extension to WYLBUR's command vocabulary that gives WYLBUR many of the capabilities associated with traditional programming languages, The extension was written by Paul Andersen.
      2. The second facility is a batch preprocessor that permits the WYLBUR programmer to develop WYLBUR command programs in a language similar to PL/I. The preprocessor was developed by David J. Smith.
  - WYLBUR Learner's Guide
  - WYLBUR Reference Manual

=== SuperWylbur ===
SuperWylbur has several enhancements over the original Wylbur. The most important are

1. Supporting 3270, 3767 and NTO terminals via VTAM; as with other proprietary Wylbur versions, SuperWylbur does not use MILTEN for VTAM terminals.
2. An enhanced macro facility.
3. Supporting user-written full-screen panels

=== SuperWylbur macro Facility ===
The macro processor adds commands, constants, functions and expressions to Wylbur. Even when the command syntax does not include parameters defined to be expressions, the user can use the forms %(expression) and %%(expression) to force evaluation. If the expression is a function with no argument or a variable then the parentheses may be omitted, e.g., %.TIME instead of %(.TIME). A doubled % requests that the valued be quoted.

==== SuperWylbur constants ====
SuperWylbur has two types of constants:

- Numeric constants
  - [sign]digits[E[sign]exponent]
  - #hexdigits
- string constants
  - 'characters'
  - "characters"

==== SuperWylbur operators ====
SuperWylbur operators whose names contain only special characters need not be separated by spaces. Operators whose names contain a period and letters must be separated by spaces. SuperWylbur has the following types of operators:

===== SuperWylbur arithmetic operators =====
- + Plus
- - Minus
- * Times
- / Divide
- // Integer divide
- .DIV synonym for //
- .MOD Modulus
- ** Exponential

===== SuperWylbur relational operators =====
- < (.LT) Less than
- <= (.LE) Less than or equal
- = (.EQ) Equals
- >= (.GE) Greater or equal
- > (GT) Greater
- ¬< (.NLT) Not less than
- ¬<= (.NLE) Not less than or equal
- ¬= (.NEQ) Not equal
- ¬>= (.NGE) Not greater than or equal
- ¬> (.NGT) Not greater than

===== SuperWylbur logical operators =====
- & (.AND) And
- | (.OR) Or
- ¬ (.NOT) Not

==== SuperWylbur macro functions ====
The name of a macro function begins with a period. If there are arguments, a colon separates them from the name. A semicolon separates successive arguments. SuperWylbur provides the following types of macro functions:

===== arithmetic functions =====
- .ABS
- .ACOS
- .ASIN
- .ATAN
- .CEILING
- .COS
- .COSH
- .COTAN
- .DEG
- .E
- .ERF
- .ERFC
- .EXP
- .FLOOR
- .FRACTION
- .GAMMA
- .LGAMMA
- .LOG
- .LOG10
- .PI
- .RAD
- .ROUND
- .SIN
- .SINH
- .SQRT
- .TAN
- .TANH
- .TRUNCATE

===== accounting functions =====
- .CHARGE
- .CONNTIME
- .CPUTIME
- .MEMACT
- .MEMCPU
- .MEMORY
- .MEMTIME
- .PAGES
- .PAGESECS
- .PAGING
- .TERMIO

===== date and time conversion =====
s parameters default to current date or time

- .DATE
- .DATE4
- .DAYS
- .DAYS
- .FULLDATE
- .JDATE
- .JDATE4
- .TIME
- .TIME100
- .TIME24
- .TIMEMIC

===== environmental queries =====
Most of these return values from SET commands:

- .ACCOUNT
- .ALARM
- .AUTOLOG
- .BACK
- .BATCH
- .BIN
- .CASE
- .CONFIRM
- .CONT
- .CPU
- .DSFORMAT
- .EDIT
- .EXTDS
- .FSASIZE
- .LENGTH
- .LNDP
- .LOGONID
- .MAILDSN
- .MAILVOL
- .NOTIFY
- .PORT
- .PREFIX
- .PRIV
- .PROJECT
- .PROMEM
- .PUBPREFIX
- .PUBVOL
- .RECDSN
- .RECVOL
- .ROOM
- .RSASIZE
- .SCRSIZE
- .SSASIZE
- .SWCOUNT
- .SWSYSPRE
- .SYSMDSN
- .SYSMVOL
- .SYSNAME
- .T3270
- .TABS
- .TALK
- .TERMINAL
- .TERSE
- .TIMEOUT
- .USER
- .VERSION
- .VOLUME
- .WIDTH

===== full screen functions =====
- .CURSORPOSN
- .CURSORVAR
- .EDIT
- .EDITLINE
- .ENTRYKEY
- .SCRNUPDT
- .VARUPDATE

===== JES functions =====
- .FETCHLIN
- .LASTJOB

===== macro functions =====
- .ARG
- .CARG
- .CMDCOUNT
- .CMDLIMIT
- .CMDMAX
- .DSEXIST
- .DSNAME
- .INITIAL
- .LASTJOB
- .LATTN
- .LERR
- .MRETURN
- .NATIVE
- .XLATTN
- .XLERR

===== string functions =====
- .BYTE
- .CHAR
- .COLUMNS
- .DASH
- .EXTEND
- .FINDEX
- .HEX
- .HEXSTR
- .INDEX
- .LOWER
- .PAD
- .QUOTE
- .REVERSE
- .ROMAN
- .STRHEX
- .STRING
- .STRLEN
- .SUBSTRING
- .TRANSLATE
- .TRIM
- .UPPER
- .VERIFY

===== working file functions =====
s arguments default to current default working data set

- .CURRENT
- .END
- .FIRST
- .LAST
- .LENGTH
- .LINE
- .LINENO
- .MACRO
- .MAXTEMPS
- .NUMTEMPS
- .SIZE
- .TEMPORARY
- .TEMPSLEFT
- .TEMPUPD
- .TEXT

===== Complete list of macro functions =====
.ABS:n
Absolute value
.ACCOUNT
Account number from logon id
.ACOS:x
Arc cosine x
.ALARM
1 if beep on next terminal write
.ARG
Arguments passed to macro
.ASIN:x
Arc sine x
.ATAN:x
Arc tangent x
.AUTOLOG
Value of SET AUTOLOG; used for recovery from previous session
.BACK
SET option: BACK or NOBACK
.BATCH:s
Value of SET BATCH option s
.BIN
Value from SET ROOM
.BYTE:(s[;i])
Convert byte i of s to integer
.CARG
Arguments passed to a user defined command defined with SET COMMAND
.CASE
Value from SET CASE: UPPER or UPLOW
.CEILING:n
Truncate up
.CHAR:i
Convert i to a single EBCDIC character
.CHARGE
Current session charge in dollars and cents
.CMCOUNT
Macro commands with no terminal I/O
.CMDCOUNT
Macro commands with no terminal I/O
.CMDLIMIT
Value from SET CMDLIMIT; maximum macro commend without terminal I/O
.CMDMAX
Maximum allowed in SET CMDLIMIT
.CMLIMIT
Value from SET CMDLIMIT; maximum macro commend without terminal I/O
.COLUMNS:s;i1[;i2]
Substring of s from column i1 to column i2
.CONFIRM
1 if SET CONFIRM
.CONNTIME
Connect tinme in seconds to 2 decimal places
.CONT
Continuation character
.COS:x
Cosine x
.COSH:x
Hyperbolic cosine x
.COTAN:x
Cotangent x
.CPU
CPU id from SMF
.CPUTIME
CPU time in seconds to 2 decimal places
.CURRENT[:s]
Current line number of working data set s; -1 if it does not exist, -2 if it is empty
.CURPOSN
Cursor position at last interrupt in form row+col/1000; -1 if not 3270
.CURSORVAR
Variable name for field containing cursor at last interrupt
.DASH
Dash character used by HYPHENATE ('62'X)
.DATE[:s]
Convert Julian date s (yy.ddd or yyyy.ddd) to mm/dd/yy
.DATE4[:s]
Convert Julian date s (yy.ddd or yyyy.ddd) to mm/dd/yyyy
.DAY[:s]
Day of week s (mm/dd/yy or mm/dd/yyyy) falls on
.DAYS[:s]
Days since 01/01/1900 to s
.DEG:x
Convert x radians to degrees
.DSEXIST:s1[;s2)
1 if data set s1 exists on volume s2 (may be CATLG)
.DSFORMAT
Value from SET DSFORMAT: TERSE or VERBOSE
.DSNAME:s
Converts s to a fully qualified data set name
.E
e
.EDIT
1 if in a full screen edit environment
.EDITLINE
Line number at top of edit frame, -1 if not 3270, -2 if no full screen edit, -3 empty
.END[:s]
Next integer after last line number in working data set s
.ENTRYKEY
Key causing last interrupt: CLEAR, CURSEL, ENTER, PA1-PA3, PFK1-PRK24
.ERF:x
Error function
.ERFC:x
Error function
.EXP:x
e^x
.EXTDS
1 if sessiona supports 3270 extended data stream
.EXTEND:(s1;i[;s2])
Append as many copies of s2 (default " ") as necessary to s1 to get length i
.FETCHLIN
Lines fetched by FETCH command
.FIRST[:s]
First line number of working data set s; -1 if it does not exist, -2 if it is empty
.FLOOR:i
Truncate down
.FRACTION:n
Fractional part of n
.FSASIZE
Size of 3270 full screen area
.FULLDATE[:s]
Convert mm/dd/yy or mm/dd/yyyy to month day, yyyy
.GAMMA:x
Gamma(x)
.HELPDSN
Name of help data set
.HELPVOL
Volume serial number of help data set or CATLG
.HEX:(i1[;i2])
Convert i1 to hexadecimal, zero padded to length i2
.HEXSTR:s
Convert hexadecimal s to string
.INDEX:s1[;s2])
First column at which s2 occurs in s1; 0 if no match
.INITIAL:s
1 if variable s initialized
.INPUT:i
Contents of current line of channel i; advance current line pointer
.JDATE[:s]
Convert s from mm/dd/yy or mm/dd/yyyy to Julian date yy.ddd
.JDATE4[:s]
Convert s from mm/dd/yy or mm/dd/yyyy to Julian date yyyy.ddd
.LAST[:s]
Last line number of working data set s; -1 if it does not exist, -2 if it is empty
.LASTJOB
Job number of last job submitted with the RUN command
.LATTN
Line number of line executing when attention exit was taken at the current macro level; -1 if cleared or no exit taken
.LENGTH
Value from SET LENGTH
.LENGTH:n[;[s][[;i]])
Length of line i lines after (before if negative) line n of working data set s
.LERR
Line number of line executing when error exit was taken at the current macro level; -1 if cleared or no exit taken
.LGAMMA:x
Ln(Gamma(x))
.LINE:n[;[s][[;i]])
Line i lines after (before if negative) line n of working data set s
.LINENO:n[;[s][[;i]])
Number i lines after (before if negative) line n of working data set s
.LNDP
Line number decimal places (3)
.LOG:x
Ln x
.LOGONID
Logon id used for current session
.LOG10:x
Log_{10} x
.LOWER:s
Convert s to lower case
.MACRO
Name of macro currently executing
.MAILDSN
Data set name of mail data set
.MAILVOL
Volume serial number of mail data set or CATLG
.MAXTEMPS
Maximum number of non-default temporaries allowed in session
.MEMACT
Bytes accessed during session
.MEMCPU
Bytes*seconds to 2 decimal places
.MEMORY
Working storage in use
.MEMTIME
Storage*seconds to 2 decimal places
.MRETURN
Line number of currently executing macro line
.NATIVE[:i]
1 if CONTROL NATIVE is in effect at macro level i (default current)
.NEXT:i
Current line pointer for channel i
.NOTIFY
1 if SET NOTIFY is in effect
.NUMBER:s
String representation of the value of expression s
.NUMTEMPS
Number of non-default temporaries in use by session
.PAD:n [ ; [-]i1[[;i2]])
Same as .STRING but pad with zero instead of space
.PAGES
Number of SuperWylbur pages in use by session
.PAGESECS
Pages*seconds
.PAGING
Number of paging operations in current session
.PI
π (Pi)
.PINDEX:s1;s2)
First match of pattern s2 in s1; column + fraction(length/1000); 0 if no match
.PORT
VTAM node name or cuu
.PREFIX
Value from SET PREFIX
.PRIV:s
1 if user has privilege s
.PROJECT
Project name
.PROMEM
ProfIle member when not in recovery
.PUBPREFIX
Prefix for public data sets (&PUBLIC)
.PUBVOL
Volume serial number of public data sets or CATLG
.QUOTE:s1[;s2])
Quote s1 using framing character s2
.RAD:x
Convert x degrees to radians
.RECDSN
Data set name of recovery data set after LOGOFF INTACT
.RECVOL
Volume on which to create recovery data sets or CATLG
.REVERSE:s
Reverse the order of string s
.RJECMD
Number of JES commands issued during session
.ROMAN:i
Lower case Roman numerals for i
.ROOM
Value from SET ROOM
.ROUND:n[;i])
Round n to i decimal places
.RSASIZE
Size of 3270 reserve screen area
.SCRNUPDT
The user updated a panel field since the last write
.SCRSIZE
Screen size as rows.columns 3 digits after decimal point) or -1 if not 3270
.SIN:x
Sine x
.SINH:x
Hyperbolic sine x
.SIZE[:s]
Number of lines in working data set s; -1 if it does not exist
.SQRT:x
Square root of x
.SSASIZE
Size of 3270 standard screen area
.STRHEX:s
Convert first 127 characters in EBCIDIC string s to hexadecimal
.STRING:n
Value of expression with no exponential notation
.STRING:(n;i1)
Value of expression with length i1
.STRING:(n;i1;i2)
Value of expression with length i1 and i2 decimal places
.STRING:(n;-i1)
Value of expression with maximum length i1
.STRING:(n;-i1;i2)
Value of expression with maximum length i1 and i2 decimal places
.STRLEN:s
Number of characters in s
.SUBSTRING:(s;i1[;i2])
Substring of s from column i1 for i2 columns
.SWCOUNT
Number of users logged on to this SuperWylbur task
.SWSYSPRE
System data set prefix
.SYSMDSN
Public system macro data set name
.SYSMVOL
Public system macro volume serial number or CATLG
.SYSNAME
Task name of current SuperWylbur instance
.TABS
Tab settings, comma separated
.TALK
Value from SET TALK (SET BREAK): TALK or NOTALK
.TAN:x
Tangent x
.TANH:x
Hyperbolic tangent x
.TEMPORARY
Unique name for new temporary
.TEMPSLEFT
Number of available non-default temporaries for session
.TEMPUPD[:s]
1 if working file s has been updated since last SAVE
.TERMINAL
Terminal name or value of .PORT
.TERMIO
Number of terminal I/O operations in current session
.TERSE
TERSE or VERBOSE
.TEXT
Current default working data set
.TIME
12-hour time in form hh:mm:ss x.m.
.TIMEMIC
11 digit microseconds since midnight
.TIMEOUT
0 if SET NO TIMEOUT, 1 if SET TIMEOUT, -1 if no TIME privilege
.TIMEOUT:(i[;s])
Value of i'th timeout interval for s (USER or SYSTEM)
.TIME100
Number of seconds since midnight to 2 decimal places
.TIME24
24-hour time
.TRANSLATE:(s1;s2;s3)
Translate s1 using input table s2 and output table s3
.TRIM:(s1;s2[;s3])
Remove s2 from the ends of s1 according to s3: L = left, R = right (default), B = both
.TRUNCATE:(n[;i])
Truncate n to i decimal places
.T3270
1 if 3270
.UPPER:s
Convert s to upper case
.USER
User portion of logon id
.VARUPDATE
Number of panel screen variables that the user updated since the last write; -1 if not 3270
.VERIFY:(s1[;s2])
First position in s1 not present in s2; 0 if all characters in s1 are in s2
.VERSION
SuperWylbur level in form version.release - PTF
.VOLUME
Volume set for the session, CATLG or null
.WIDTH
Value of SET WIDTH
.XLATTN
Line number of attention exit for current macro level; -1 if no attention exit set
.XLERR
Line number of error exit for current macro level; -1 if no error exit set

==== SuperWylbur macro pseudofunctions ====
Pseudofunctions are like functions, except that they appear on the left hand side of an assignment, e.g., LET .foo:bar=baz.

.COLUMNS:(v;i1[;i2])
Replace columnsi1 through i2 of v
.CURSOR
Set panel variable on which to place cursor
.FILE:i
Associate a working data set with channel i
.LINE:(n[;[s][[;i]])
Replace or insert line n in working data set s if i is omitted or zero
Replace line i lines after (before if negative) line 'n' in working data set 's'
.NEXT:i
Set current line pointer for channel i
.OUTPUT:i
Add or replace current line of channel i, advance current line pointer
.SUBSTRING:(v;i1[;i2])
Replace column i1 of v for i2 columns
.UPDATE:i
Replace the last line read from channel i

==== SuperWylbur macro statements ====
- ¬command[;command]* (native command)
- CALL what temp-opts process-opts arg VALUE var-name
- CLEAR LOCALS
- CLEAR MACRO
- CLEAR MACROS
- CLEAR TRACE
- COMMENT
- CONTROL
- DEMAND
- DO
- DO UNTIL
- DO WHILE
- END
- EXECUTE
- EXIT
- GO
- GO TO
- IF
- LET variable = expression
- LOOP [USING variable] FROM expression-1 TO expression-2 [BY expression-3]
- MATCH pattern expression command
- OTHERWISE
- PAUSE
- SELECT [expression]
- SET EXIT
- SET LIMIT
- SET TRACE
- SCAN KEYWORD
- SCAN POSITIONAL
- SHOW GLOBALS
- SHOW LIMIT
- SHOW LOCALS
- SHOW MACRO
- SHOW MACROS
- SHOW PANELS
- SIGNAL
- TYPE
- TYPEI
- WAIT interval
- WAIT b
- WHEN (expression [;expression]*)

== See also ==
- Time-sharing system evolution
