= Supervisory program =

Computer program

A supervisory program or supervisor is a computer program that is usually referred as an operating system. It controls the execution of other routines such as regulating work schedules, input/output operations, and error actions.

Historically, this term was essentially associated with IBM's line of mainframe operating systems starting with OS/360. In other operating systems, the supervisor is generally called the kernel.
