= BOS/360 =

Early IBM System/360 operating system

Basic Operating System/360 (BOS/360)
- Developer: IBM General Products Division (GPD)
- Working state: Discontinued
- Initial release: October 1965; 60 years ago
- Marketing target: IBM mainframe computers
- Available in: English
- Supported platforms: System/360
- License: Proprietary

Basic Operating System/360 (BOS/360) was an early IBM System/360 operating system.

== Origin ==
BOS was one of four System/360 Operating System versions developed by the IBM General Products Division (GPD) in Endicott, New York to fill a gap at the low end of the System/360 line when it became apparent that OS/360 was not able to run on the smallest systems. BPS (Basic Programming support) was designed to run on systems with a minimum of 8 KB of main storage and no disk. BOS was intended for disk systems with at least 8 KB and one 2311 disk drive. DOS and TOS were developed from BOS for systems with at least 16 KB and either disks (DOS) or tape drives only (TOS).

BOS was released in October 1965, nearly two years before OS/360, thus BOS was the only disk based operating system available at launch for a machine that was marketed as disk based.

== Components ==
BOS consisted of the following components:

- Control programs:
  - The supervisor.
  - Job control capable of running jobs sequentially from the card reader.
  - The IPL loader.
- System Service Programs:
  - The Linkage Editor.
  - The Librarian, supporting a core-image library, and optionally a macro library and a relocatable library.
  - The "Load System Program," a sysgen program to build a disk-resident BOS system from cards.
- IBM-supplied processing programs which could be installed with BOS:
  - Language translators, an Assembler and an RPG compiler. Compilers for FORTRAN IV and COBOL were added later.
  - Autotest, a debugging aid.
  - Sort/Merge.
  - Utility programs for file-to-file copy between devices and formats.
  - Remote Job Entry allowing the BOS system to submit jobs to a remote System/360 and receive output.
- Data Management, consisting of supervisor support for Physical IOCS, and macros for Logical IOCS which could be incorporated into the user's processing programs.

== IBM 1070 Process Communication Supervisor ==
The IBM 1070 Process Communication Supervisor was a dedicated process control system that ran as an extension under BOS "Relying on the BOS supervisor to handle ordinary physical and logical I/O operations (i. e., for cards, disk, etc.), the PC supervisor is specialized to the process control aspects of the user's program."
