= VT640 =

Expansion board for DEC terminals

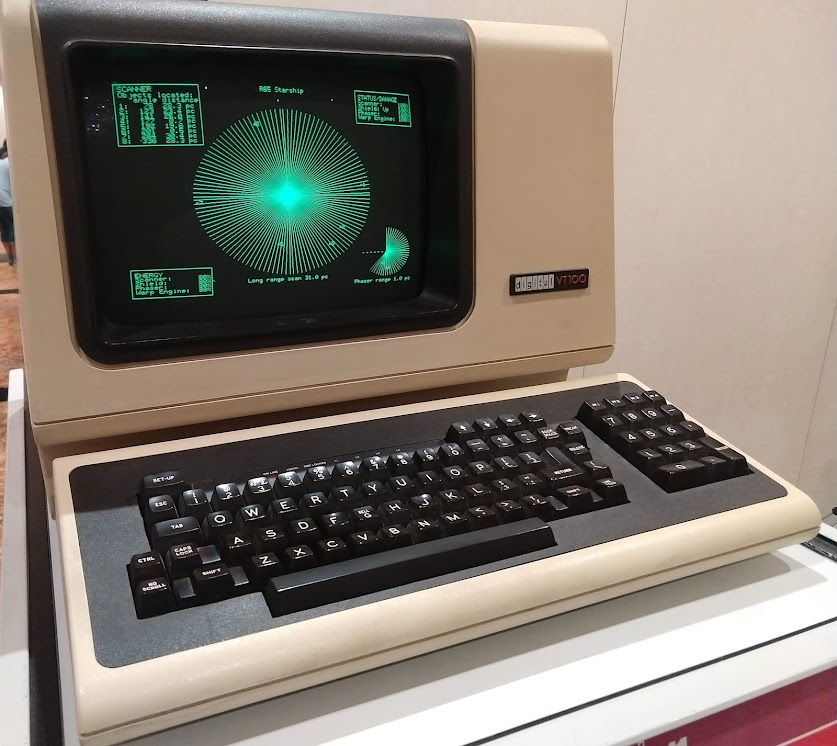
A DEC VT100 with the VT-640 Retro-Graphics board installed

The VT640 Retro-Graphics, originally known as the VT100 Retro-Graphics, is an expansion board that was developed by Digital Engineering, Inc., for Digital Equipment Corporation's popular VT100 terminal, allowing it to be used as a graphics terminal capable of a resolution of 640 by 480 pixels. Digital Engineering introduced the VT640 in September 1980 as the second in their line of Retro-Graphics text-to-graphics-terminal conversion boards.

== Specifications ==
The VT640 board displays graphics at a resolution of 640 by 480 pixels on the VT100's monochrome, green-phosphor CRT. The board boasts full graphical compatibility with the Tektronix 4010 and featured the ability to plot individual points on the screen as well as solid, dotted, and dashed lines based on vector instructions, as well as the ability to selectively erase portions of the screen and change the size of text characters on the fly. The VT640 could work with Tektronix's Plot 10 CAD software and ISSCO's Tellagraf chart-making software and Tellaplan report generator. An optional light pen allows the VT100 with the VT640 board installed to emulate the 4010 in the latter's graphic input mode.

== History ==
Digital Engineering reportedly sold millions of dollars' worth of the VT640 and other Retro-Graphics products within the first year of availability. A large institutional user of the VT640 in 1983 was the Los Alamos National Laboratory (LANL), who retrofitted 200 of their VT100s with VT640 boards. LANL used the VT640 to render geometrically complex models of technologies such as nuclear reactors and check for visually obvious errors in the models before they are ready to be subjected to simulations. Another large customer of the VT640 was the Lockheed Missiles and Space Company, who used it to display the output of interferometers during mechanical stress and strain measurements conducted on the materials used as the skin of their aircraft. In around 1983, New England Digital began equipping their Synclavier II musical sampler–synthesizer workstation with VT640-equipped VT100s.

Digital Engineering released an update to the VT640 in 1981 in the form of the VT640S, spread across three expansion boards. The company went out of business by 1986.
