= TuneBuilder =

TuneBuilder was an early digital music editor that automatically recombined segments of digital audio files to create variations of new musical performances of different duration and order.

The software was designed to replace standard physical music editing techniques in industries using commercial music catalogs, including soundtrack temping, radio and television advertising, film/video sound scoring, and theme production.

Manual editing labor was reduced from a typical time involvement of several minutes per edit by a skilled editor performing a multiplicity of edits per selection, to just a few seconds for an unskilled user to perform all edits required to re-length or re-order the music selection.

The program consisted of several modules including an automatic editor interface (TuneBuilder), a control file production module (AutoBlade), a search utility (TuneFinder), and audio file format exchanges (S/Link).

TuneBuilder's technology was invented by Darryl Goede with a U.S. patent granted in 1998. The TuneBuilder patent was further cited in twenty-three subsequent patents. The patent describes the technology as the creation and storage of a mapping/descriptive file that located sections of music stored as digital files. Then in a subsequent process, the mapping file then directed a processor to produce an audio output stream consisting of a new sequence of the sections.

There were 18,000 commercial music selections mapped to work under TuneBuilder, drawn from libraries including Bertelsmann Music Group (BMG), Killer Tracks, and KPM Musichouse.

As an editing software, TuneBuilder was commercialized and marketed from 1996 to 1999 by AirWorks Media Incorporated, a Canadian company.

Editing systems were initially developed for MS-DOS, Mac, and Amiga.

A Windows 95 version was released in mid-1996 that incorporated software purchased by AirWorks in late 1995 from SOC Associates who had acquired the software in the breakup of New England Digital, developers of the Synclavier.

The components of TuneBuilder were being re-integrated in 1999 into a sound handling suite called "SoundHouse" when AirWorks Media ceased operations.

== See also ==
- List of music software

== Publications ==
The Handbook of Digital Publishing, Volume II by Michael L. Kleper, Tim Moore (Editor) ISBN 978-0-13-029371-8
