= Fostex Foundation 2000 =

Digital audio workstation

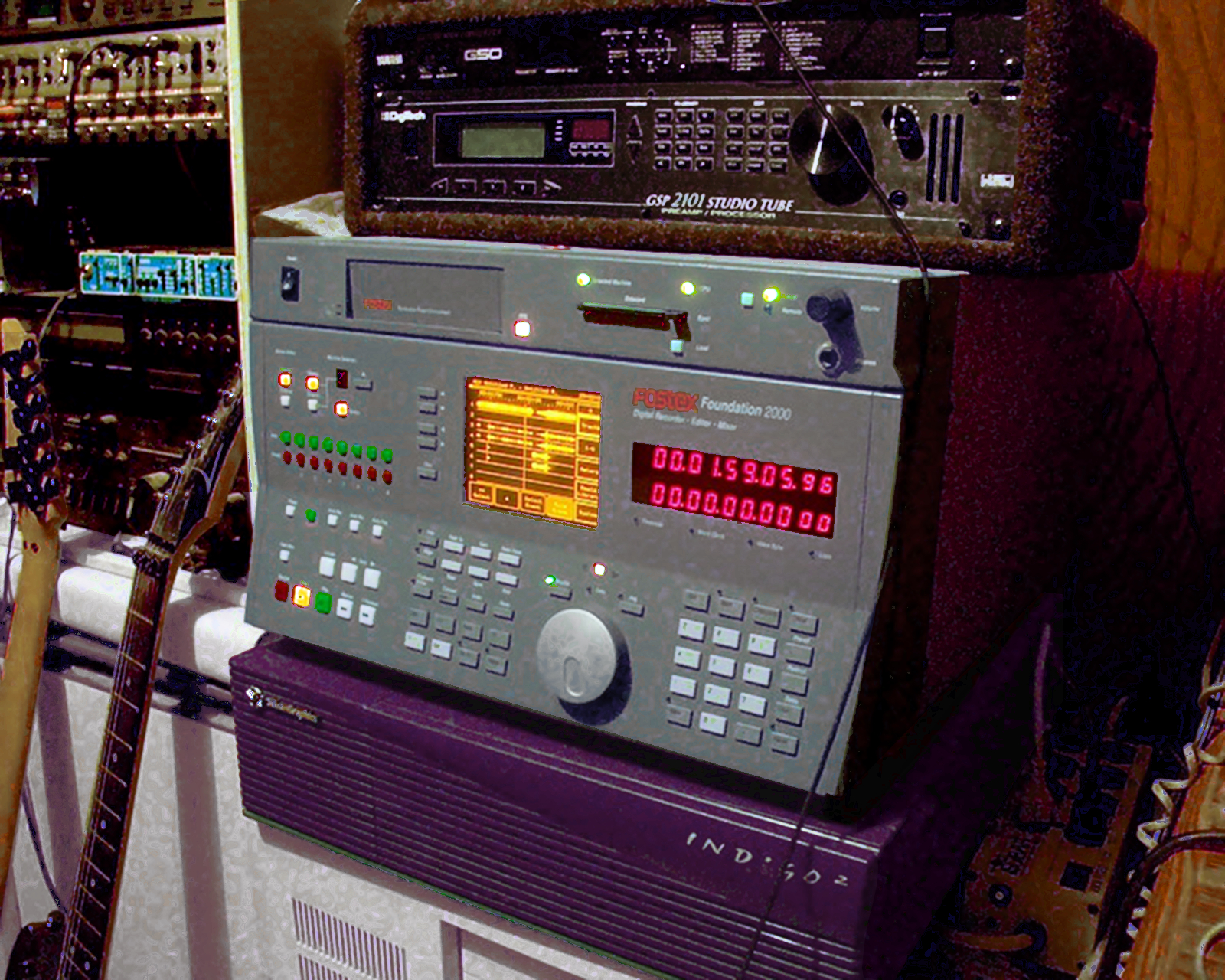
Fostex Foundation 2000 multitrack digital audio recording system

The Fostex Foundation 2000 was a high-end digital audio workstation that Fostex introduced in 1993, at a cost of about $60,000. Many of its engineers were refugees from the recently bankrupt New England Digital, makers of the highly regarded and much more pricey Synclavier music workstation. It was considered a very innovative product in its time for its intuitive touch-screen user-interface and very high performance. The Foundation 2000 cost approximately $60,000 when it was introduced and ended up not being successful in the market. Software updates were still being released as late as 1996. A cheaper version called the Fostex Foundation 2000RE was also sold.

Among its most highly touted features was a hot-swappable SCSI drive enclosure (referred to as the RPE, or Removable Project Environment) that maintains the entire system state at all times, allowing one to immediately switch between different projects and always able to return where they left off, virtually instantaneously. Additionally, the Foundation 2000 editor could back up and restore projects from/to a SCSI tape drive in the background, while the user continued working with the system.

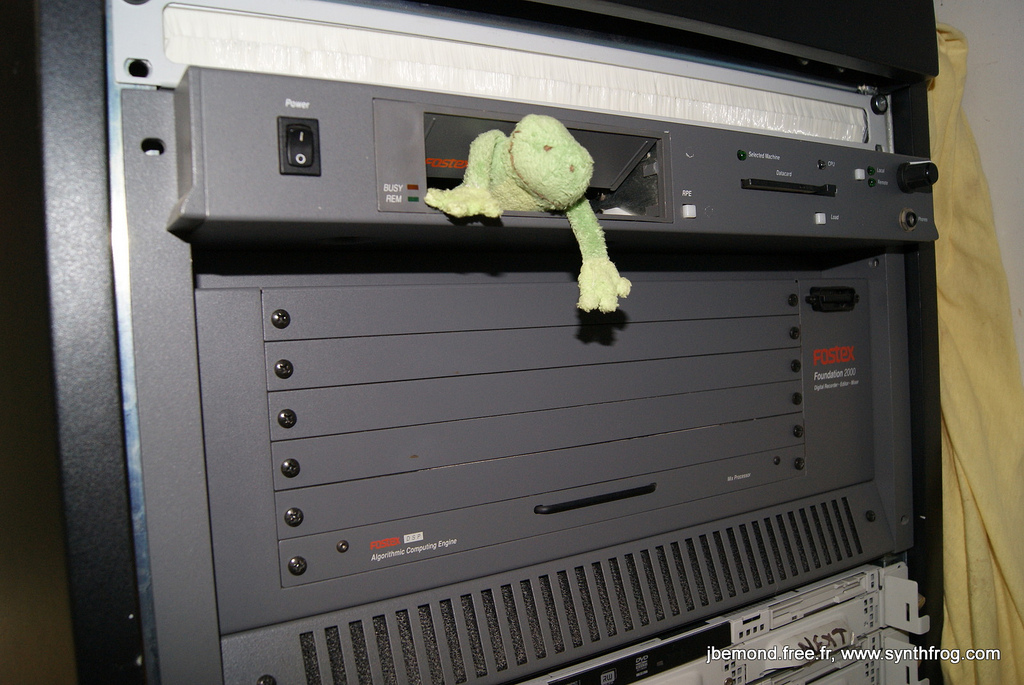
Main unit has six board slots,
and one slot is occupied by DSP Algorithmic Computing Engine.
(photographs from jbemond.free.fr, www.synthfrog.com)

A user operated the machine through the 'Edit Controller' which connected to the main unit with a 25' cable that attached to either the front or back of the main unit, or the controller can be affixed onto the front of the main unit.

The Fostex Foundation 2000 was highly modular in that functionality could be added to the system by way of boards slid into the front or back of the main processing unit. On the back of the system, a variety of connectivity options were available such as analog audio, coaxial/XLR/toslink optical connectors for input and output, SCSI (for external hard drives or tape backup units), various sync sources (video/SMPTE/etc), MIDI, and RS-422 ports for remote controlling the Foundation 2000 from other devices, or using it to control other devices. The front of the unit was limited to adding 'algorithmic computing engine' boards, basically DSPs devoted to routing sound between tracks and performing three-band EQ on each of the 16 tracks individually. Ports were provided for daisy chaining multiple Foundation 2000 units, but apparently no support was ever implemented. The system supports 24-bit audio processing but the standard analog inputs/outputs are handled by 18-bit DAC/ADCs (8x and 64x oversampling, respectively) and, at least with the original version of the firmware, recorded as 16-bit audio.

Internally, the Foundation 2000 hardware is controlled by a Motorola 68030 CPU with a Motorola 68000 inside the Edit Controller to handle the touch-screen display and buttons. In addition to two Motorola 56002 DSPs, each a 40 MHz DSP that operates natively on 24-bit data, on the main CPU boards, the unit could be expanded by adding up to six "Algorithmic Computing Engine" Mix Processors boards, each containing four additional Motorola 56002 DSP processor. A fully loaded Foundation 2000 contains 26 of these programmable processors, however, it is unclear what benefits are gained since the last revision of the software appears to only use them to for signal routing, stereo panning and three-band eq for the machine's 8 audio tracks.

Originally the Foundation 2000 was announced by Fostex to their internal distributors at a distributor meeting but only after all distributors had signed an agreement of confidentiality, as all was top-secret at that time. The sales of the Foundation 2000 was independent of the normal sales from Japan as it was Fostex USA that handled the sales of this product.
