= New England Digital =

American manufacturing company

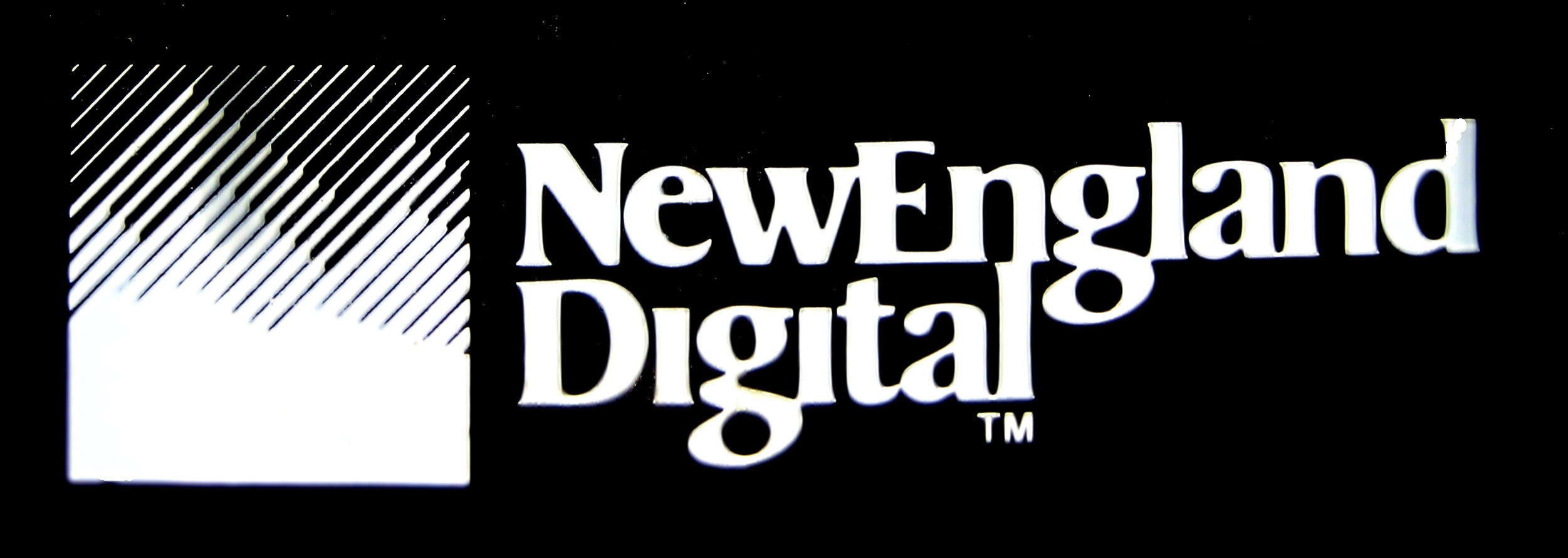

New England Digital Corporation (1976–1993) was founded in Norwich, Vermont, and relocated to White River Junction, Vermont. It was best known for its signature product, the Synclavier Synthesizer System, which evolved into the Synclavier Digital Audio System or "Tapeless Studio." The company sold an FM digital synthesizer/16-bit polyphonic synthesizer and magnetic disk-based non-linear 16-bit digital recording product, referred to as the "Post-Pro."

== History ==
=== Early years ===
The Synclavier was developed as the "Dartmouth Digital Synthesizer" by Dartmouth College Professors Jon Appleton and Frederick J. Hooven, in association with NED co-founders Sydney A. Alonso and Cameron W. Jones. The Synclavier would become the pioneering prototype hardware and software system for all digital non-linear synthesis, polyphonic sampling, magnetic (hard-disk) recording and sequencing systems technology that is commonplace in all music and sound effects/design today.

The instrument's development picked up speed in late 1978/early 1979, when master synthesist, sound designer, and musical arranger, Denny Jaeger, began working with NED to help create system upgrades, advanced capabilities, and unique sounds that were tailored to fit the needs of the product for the commercial music industry. The second generation's user interface panel and overall music design features of the original Synclavier (that would become Synclavier II) were substantially driven and designed by Denny Jaeger. His relentless attention to detail and unparalleled understanding of synthesis, audio recording, and technology provided tremendous product/market insight to the original founding hardware and software engineering team of Alonso and Jones.

=== Growth and success ===
In November 1979, immediately following the arrival of Denny Jaeger, Alonso hired Brad Naples as the company's Business Manager. Working in tandem, Jaeger and Naples were the main drivers of the marketing and sales/business development efforts of the company. However, all four individuals—Alonso, Jones, Jaeger, and Naples—worked as a collaborative team, which was quite unique and unparalleled at the time. However, Naples became the main individual to harness the collaborative nature of the 4, and importantly, drove and managed the company that grew from 8 to 215 employees with direct officers in New York, Los Angeles, Chicago and London. NED unveiled the newly improved Synclavier II at the AES show in May 1980, where it became an instant hit.

In 1981 New England Digital pioneered the recording of digital audio to hard disk with the introduction of their Sample-To-Disk option. Their software module known as SFM (Signal File Manager) was popular among the academic world for research and analysis of audio. The SFM also found use in the US Military for the analysis of submarine sounds.

The company continued to refine the Synclavier II, with Jaeger leading more musician-friendly, technological improvements, and Naples evolving to become the company's President/CEO (1983–1993) to assist Alonso and Jones, who were substantially expanding the hardware and software team. Musicians such as New York City-based multi-instrumentalist Kashif were involved in the creative development of Synclavier.

It became one of the most advanced electronic synthesis and recording tools of the day. Early adopters included:

- John McLaughlin
- Pat Metheny
- Michael Jackson, particularly on his 1982 album Thriller and more extensively on his 1987 album Bad.
- Denny Jaeger and Michel Rubini, the first to use the Synclavier to score a major motion picture (The Hunger, with David Bowie, released through MGM in April, 1983) and to score the first network TV series (The Powers of Matthew Starr, from Paramount Television, released September, 1982).
- Laurie Anderson, whose 1984 album "Mister Heartbreak" includes visual depictions of Synclavier sound waves in the liner notes
- Frank Zappa, who composed his 1986 Grammy-winning album Jazz from Hell on the instrument. He continued to use it on his studio albums until his death in 1993, culminating in the posthumous release of his magnum opus Civilization, Phaze III (by Zappa's estimation, 70% of this two-hour work is exclusively Synclavier.)
- Producer Mike Thorne, who used the Synclavier to shape the sound of the 80s producing bands such as Siouxsie and The Banshees, Soft Cell, Marc Almond, and Bronski Beat
- Record label founder Daniel Miller (Mute Records). It found use on most Depeche Mode albums in which band member Alan Wilder was involved.
- Sting
- Genesis
- The Cars
- Herbie Hancock
- Sean Callery
- Eddie Jobson

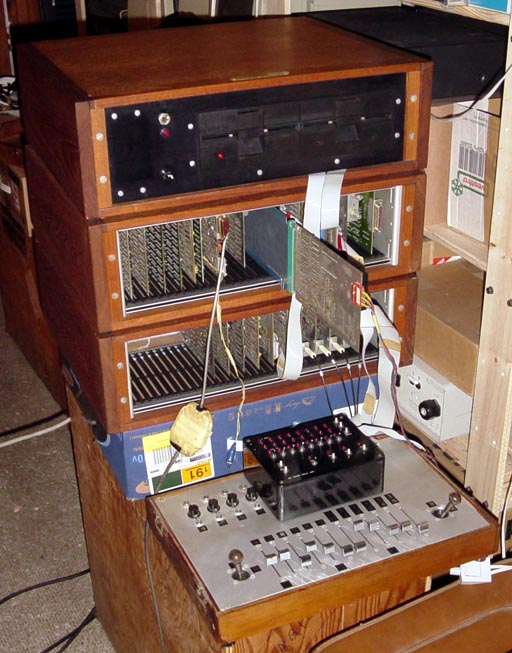

The system was nearly as famous for where it was not used, as it was for the list of premier studios in which it was: the extremely sophisticated synthesizer enjoyed the distinction of being banned from many famous concert halls, out of fear that it would make the musicians themselves obsolete. A notable exception being the massive, 55 minute Dialogue for Synclavier and Orchestra by American Composer Frank Proto, commissioned and performed by the Cincinnati Symphony Orchestra in 1986. Bringing together the full forces of a contemporary orchestra with a fully decked out Synclavier in a live performance, it displayed what can be achieved, combining both seemingly incompatible disciplines, by a composer with intimate knowledge of not only the available orchestral and electronic forces, but with the compositional skills to take advantage of both, without resorting to gimmicky devices frequently found in attempts to wed the two.

The mature Synclavier was a modular, component-based system that included facilities for FM-based synthesis, digital sampling, hard-disk recording, and sophisticated computer-based sound editing. By the late 1980s, complete Synclavier systems were selling for upwards of $200,000, to famous musicians such as Sting, Michael Jackson and Stevie Wonder, and to major studios the world over. The Synclavier was also employed by experimental musicians, such as John McLaughlin, Kraftwerk, Laurie Anderson, Frank Zappa, Kashif and Peter Buffett who used it extensively in their music. It is still used to this day in major movies for sound design, along with TV, Commercials and Music composition and production.

=== Decline ===
NED/Synclavier became a victim of the early 1990s economic downturn, its high prices as well as due in part to the fact that the technology development team which was well-funded from 1988 and 1989 to create a modest product based-upon a MacIntosh platform and the rapidly increasing capabilities of personal computers, MIDI-enabled synthesizers and low-cost digital samplers. In the span of two years, the company saw enormous sales evaporate, and in 1992 they closed their doors forever. Parts of the company were purchased by Fostex, which used the technical knowledge base of staff to build several hard-disk recording systems in the 1990s (like Fostex Foundation 2000 and 2000re), and AirWorks Media, a Canadian company who used portions of code in their TuneBuilder product line. Simultaneously, a group of ex-employees and product owners collaborated to form The Synclavier Company, primarily as a maintenance organization for existing customers, but with an eye to adapting Synclavier software for stand-alone personal computer use, while in Europe the previously profitable, but now motherless, NED Europe is run by ex-head of European operations, Steve Hills. As of 2005, it was still trading in London, England, as Synclavier Europe.

In 1998, under the company Demas, NED co-founder Cameron W. Jones (original and current owner of the Synclavier trademark and software) collaborated with ex-employee Brian S. George (owner of Demas, the company that purchased all of NED's hardware and technical assets) and original co-founding partner Sydney Alonso to develop an emulator designed to run Synclavier software for Apple Computer's Macintosh computer systems and hardware designed to share the core processing with the later generation of Apple G3 computers giving enhanced features and greater speed to the system.
