= ISSCO Graphics =

Software package

Integrated Software Systems Corporation (ISSCO), doing business as ISSCO Graphics, was an American software developer and publisher based in San Diego, California, and active from 1970 to 1986. They were best known for their enterprise graphics software packages, including Tellagraf, CueChart and Disspla.

== History ==
ISSCO Graphics had considered acquiring Breakthrough Software, whose software focus involved PC DOS, as a means of getting into the PC arena, but backed off when Computer Associates made an offer to acquire ISSCO.

By early 1987 it was reported that "Issco users breathe sigh of relief" that all was well.

The ISSCO User's Group was founded in 1976.

ISSCO, which was founded in 1970 by Peter Preuss, was acquired by Computer Associates in 1986.

== Notable products ==
=== Tellagraf ===
ISSCO's Tellagraf is an early software package designed to allow end-users to "turn out full color, professional quality charts" with initial results displayed on a screen, modified as needed, and then "a final 'hard-copy' can be made .. or made into 35mm color transparencies for projection onto a screen."

Users of Tellagraf often had access to CueChart and Disspla software. Often computer sites having one had all three.

Terminals with varying degrees of graphics, such as the DEC's VT100 and Tektronix's Tektronix 4xxx family of text and graphics terminals. were supported, and the software ran on popular computing platforms.

Four years are important to Tellagraf's early history:

- 1978: ease of use
- 1980: graphic-artist quality
- 1982: introduction of CueChart, and recognition by IEEE.
- 1983: "quality graphics enters the mainstream of data processing with ..."

Tellegraf was eventually acquired by Computer Associates and renamed CA-Tellegraf. SAS users found it helpful.

Universities, research institutes and financial services firms were among early users.

=== Disspla ===
Disspla is a package of data plotting subroutines that can be used from high level languages. It was also acquired by Computer Associates.

=== Tellaplan ===
In 1983 ISSCO introduced Tellaplan, "a project planning, report and schedule charting system for Tell-A- Graf users in IBM MVS or CMS or Digital Equipment Corp. VAX computers" atop which they built "two visual project management software packages" three years later.
