= Synclavier =

Early digital synthesizer

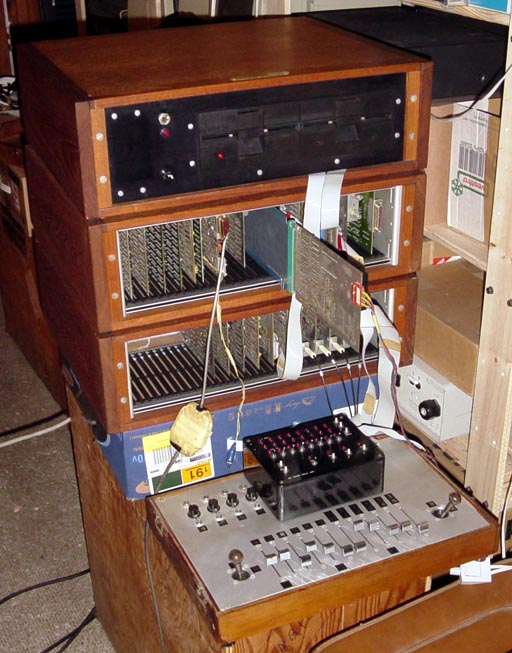
Synclavier I (1977), with HOP box

The Synclavier is an early digital synthesizer, polyphonic digital sampling system, and music workstation manufactured by New England Digital Corporation of Norwich, Vermont. It was produced in various forms from the late 1970s into the early 1990s.

Used by many notable musicians, the Synclavier was inducted into the TECnology Hall of Fame, an honor given to "products and innovations that have had an enduring impact on the development of audio technology," in 2004.

== History ==
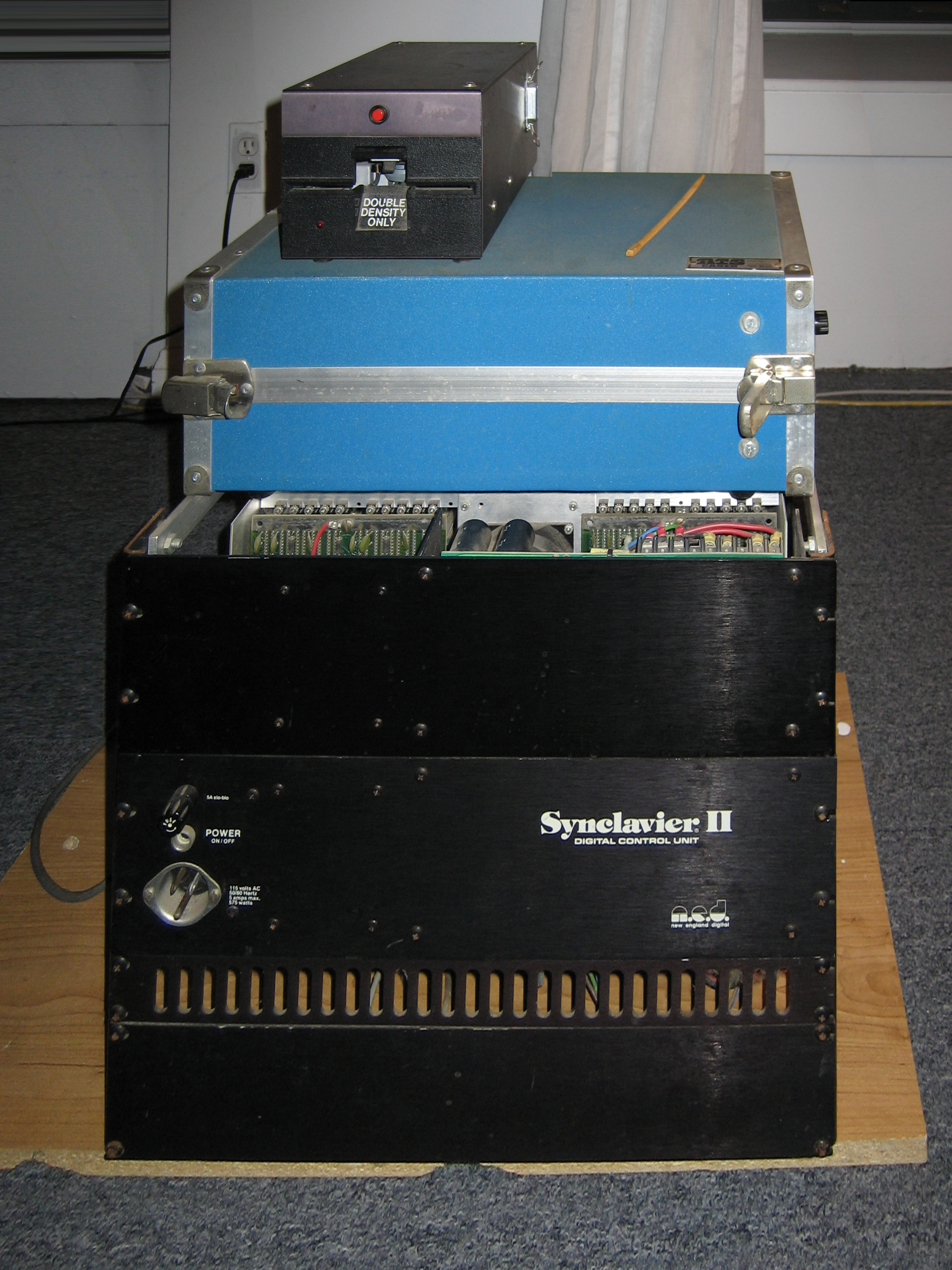
Synclavier II and floppy disc drive

The original design and development of the Synclavier prototype occurred at Dartmouth College with the collaboration of Jon Appleton, Professor of Digital Electronics, Sydney A. Alonso, and Cameron Jones, a software programmer and student at Dartmouth's Thayer School of Engineering.

=== Synclavier I ===
First released in 1977–78, it proved to be highly influential among both electronic music composers and music producers, including Mike Thorne, an early adopter from the commercial world, due to its versatility, its cutting-edge technology, and distinctive sounds.

The Synclavier architecture was based on additive synthesis, with the output of multiple digital sine wave oscillators blended to form complex timbres. The oscillators formed the fundamental frequency along with harmonics or partials. The loudness and envelope of each oscillator could be adjusted using front panel controls. New England Digital Corporation (NED) designed their own 16-bit central processor called Able, a kind of minicomputer. Such an advanced computer was required because digital additive synthesis is computationally expensive. The audible result of additive synthesis was somewhat thin, suitable for steady-state sounds such as vibrating strings: violin, harp, guitar, etc. It was not good at generating percussive sounds with fast transients. To fix this problem, NED also designed sample-based synthesis into the Synclavier, calling it "timbre frame synthesis", and allowed for an optional FM synthesis module. The sampler recorded an external sound and saved it as a sound file. Most of the standard Synclavier timbres were obtained by sampling acoustic instruments or human voices. Four layers of sound files or partial timbres could be blended to make a more complex sound, for instance, by adding a percussion sample to three brass instrument samples to get a sharper attack. If the FM synthesis module was purchased, a separate harmonic envelope feature was engaged, and a more dynamic sound could be produced.

Only about 20 Synclavier I models were built. These were sold mostly to universities. The initial models had only a computer and synthesis modules; later models added a musical keyboard and control panel.

=== Synclavier II ===
The system evolved in its next generation of product, the Synclavier II, which was released in early 1980 with the strong influence of music producer Denny Jaeger of Oakland, California. It was originally Jaeger's suggestion that the FM synthesis concept be extended to allow four simultaneous channels or voices of synthesis to be triggered with one key depression to allow the final synthesized sound to have much more harmonic series activity. This change greatly improved the overall sound design of the system and was very noticeable. 16-bit user sampling (originally in mono only) was added as an option in 1982. This model was succeeded by the ABLE Model C computer-based PSMT in 1984 and then the Mac-based 3200, 6400 and 9600 models, all of which used the VPK keyboard.

=== Keyboard controller ===
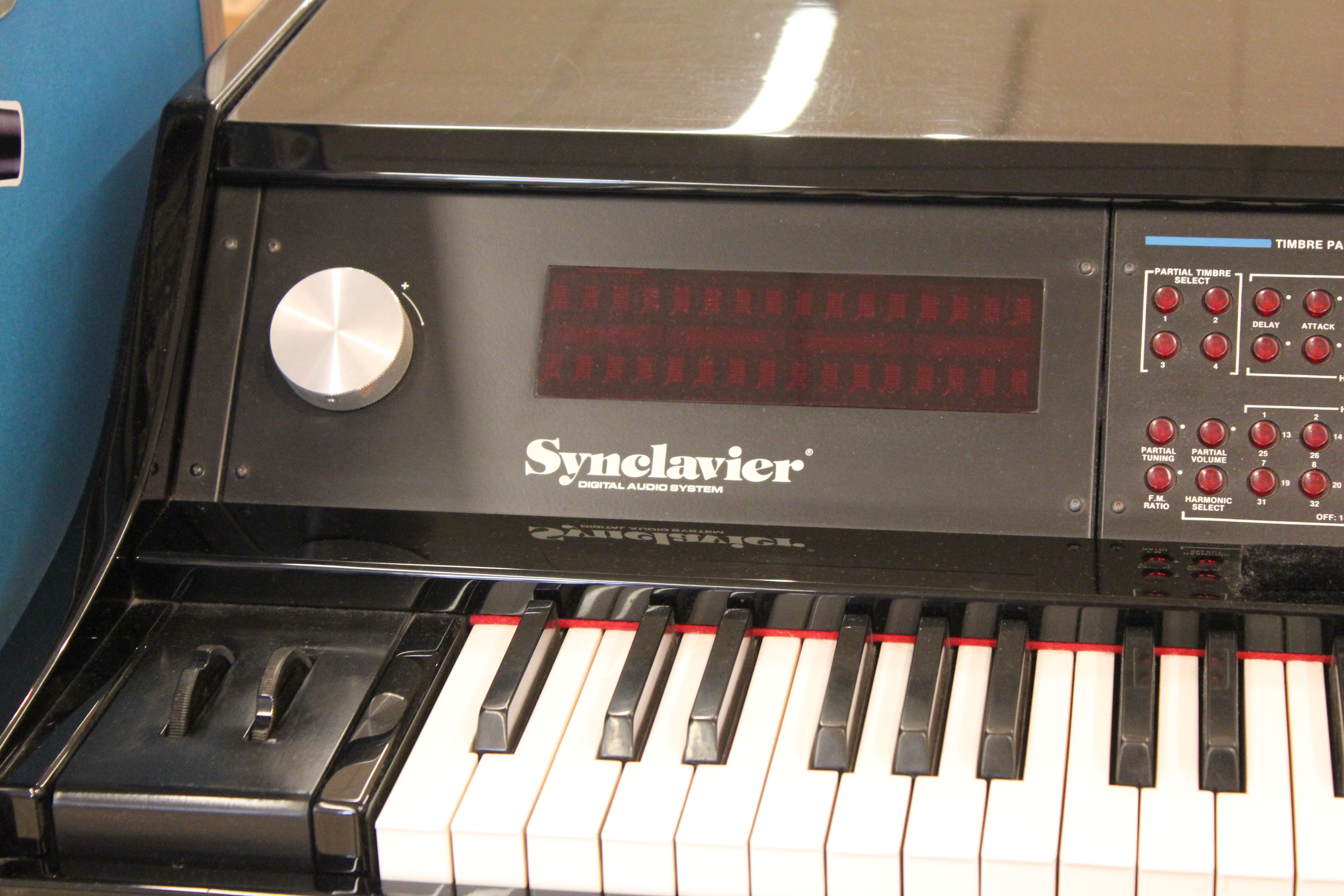
Display and control wheel on VPK (1984)

Synclavier II models used an on/off type keyboard (retroactively called the ORK) while later models, labeled simply Synclavier, used a weighted velocity- and pressure-sensitive keyboard (called the VPK) that was licensed from Sequential Circuits and used in their Prophet-T8 synthesizer.

=== Digital sampling ===
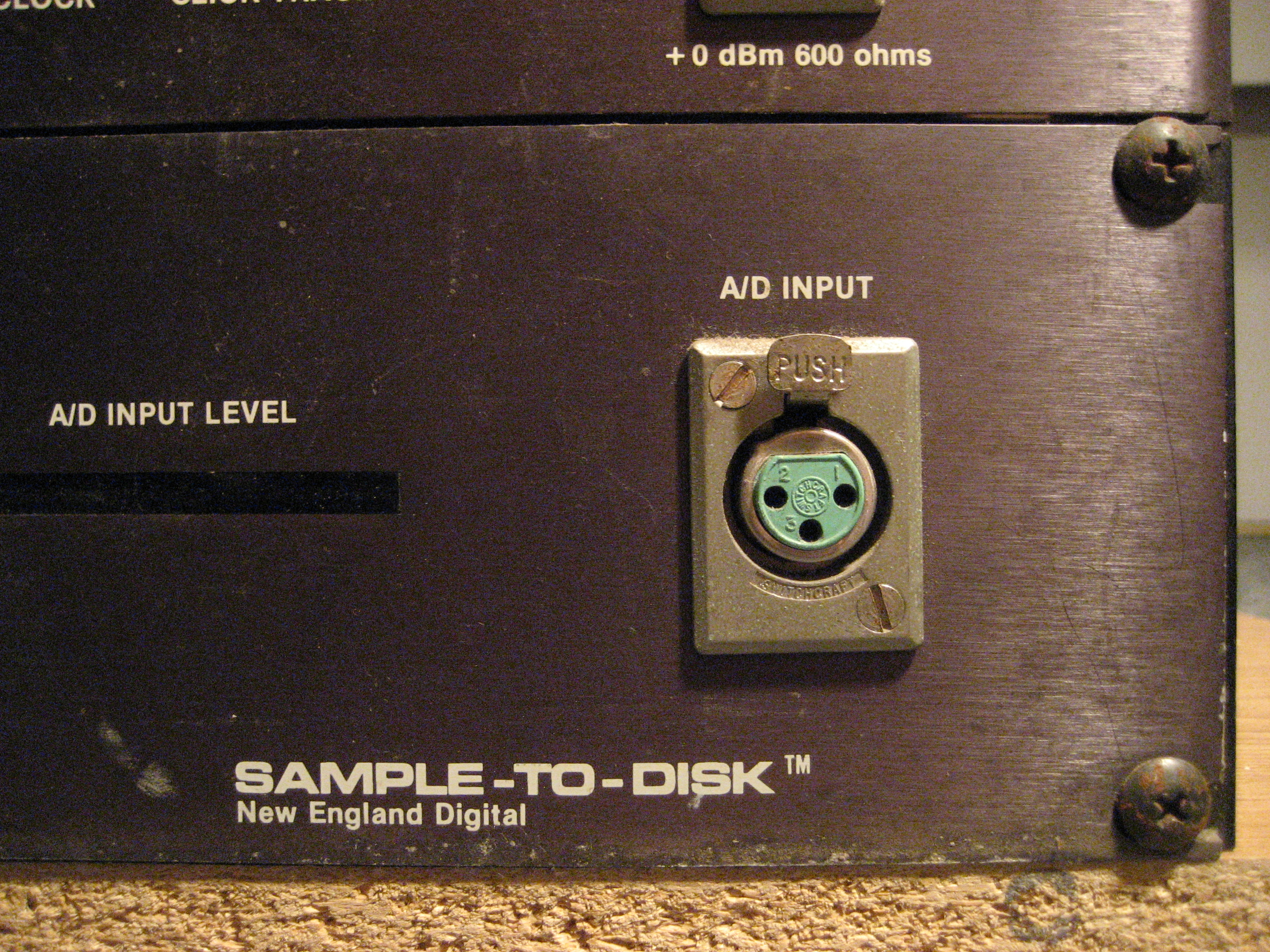
STD: Sample-To-Disk interface (c.1982)

The company evolved the system continuously through the early 1980s to integrate the first 16-bit digital sampling system to magnetic disk, and eventually a 16-bit polyphonic sampling system to memory, as well. The company's product was the only digital sampling system that allowed sample rates to go as high as 100 kHz.

=== Tapeless studio concept ===
Ultimately, the system was referred to as the Synclavier Digital Recording Tapeless Studio system among many professionals. It was a pioneering system in revolutionizing movie and television sound effects and Foley effects methods of design and production starting at Glen Glenn Sound. Although pricing made it inaccessible for most musicians (a Synclavier could cost anywhere from $25,000 to $200,000), it found widespread use among producers and professional recording studios, competing at times in this market with high-end production systems such as the Fairlight CMI.

=== Technological achievements ===
When the company launched and evolved its technology, there were no off-the-shelf computing systems, integrated software, or sound cards. Consequently, all of the hardware from the company's main real-time CPU, all input and output cards, analog-to-digital and digital-to-analog cards and its memory cards were developed internally, as well as all of the software. The hardware and software of the company's real-time capability were used in other fields completely remote to music, such as the main Dartmouth College campus computing node computers for one of the USA's first campus-wide computing networks, and in medical data acquisition research projects.

=== End of manufacture ===
New England Digital ceased operations in 1993. According to Jones, "The intellectual property was bought up by a bank—then it was owned by a Canadian company called Airworks—and I bought the intellectual property and the trademark back from a second bank, which had foreclosed on it from Airworks."

=== Reincarnations ===
In 2019, Jones released an iOS version of the Synclavier dubbed Synclavier Go! using much of the original code base. Jones has also worked with Arturia to bring the Synclavier V software version of the instrument to the Arturia V Collection plugin suite.

In 2022, Synclavier Digital released and started production on the Regen, a desktop FM synthesizer.

== Models and options ==
=== Prototype ===
- Dartmouth Digital Synthesizer (1973)

=== Processor ===
- ABLE computer (1975): an early product of New England Digital, was a 16-bit minicomputer on two cards, using a transport-triggered architecture. It used a variant of XPL called Scientific XPL for programming. Early applications of the ABLE were for laboratory automation, data collection, and device control. The commercial version of the Dartmouth Digital Synthesizer, the Synclavier, was built on this processor.

=== Digital synthesis cards ===
The waveforms are produced by the Synclavier Synthesizer cards (named SS1 through SS5). Each set of these five cards produced 8 mono voices (later variants supported stereo). The processor handles sending start-stop-setPitch-setParameter commands to the SS card set(s), as well as handling scanning of the keyboard and control panel. There is little public documentation available on these cards, as their design was the unique asset of the Synclavier. However, their structure was similar to other digital synthesizers of the mid-late 1970s, such as the Bell Labs Digital Synthesizer and realized in medium-scale integration hardware.

=== Black panel models ===
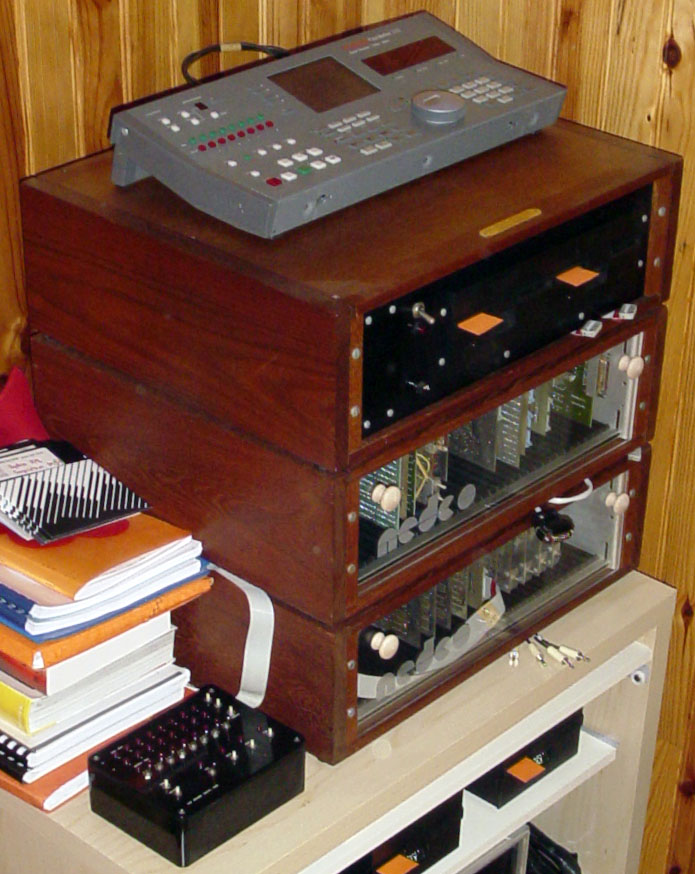
Synclavier I

On 1970s–late 1980s:

- Synclavier I (1977)
  - Hand Operated Processor (HOP box): a troubleshooting tool for the Synclavier system, connected to ABLE computer via D01 Front Panel Interface Card.
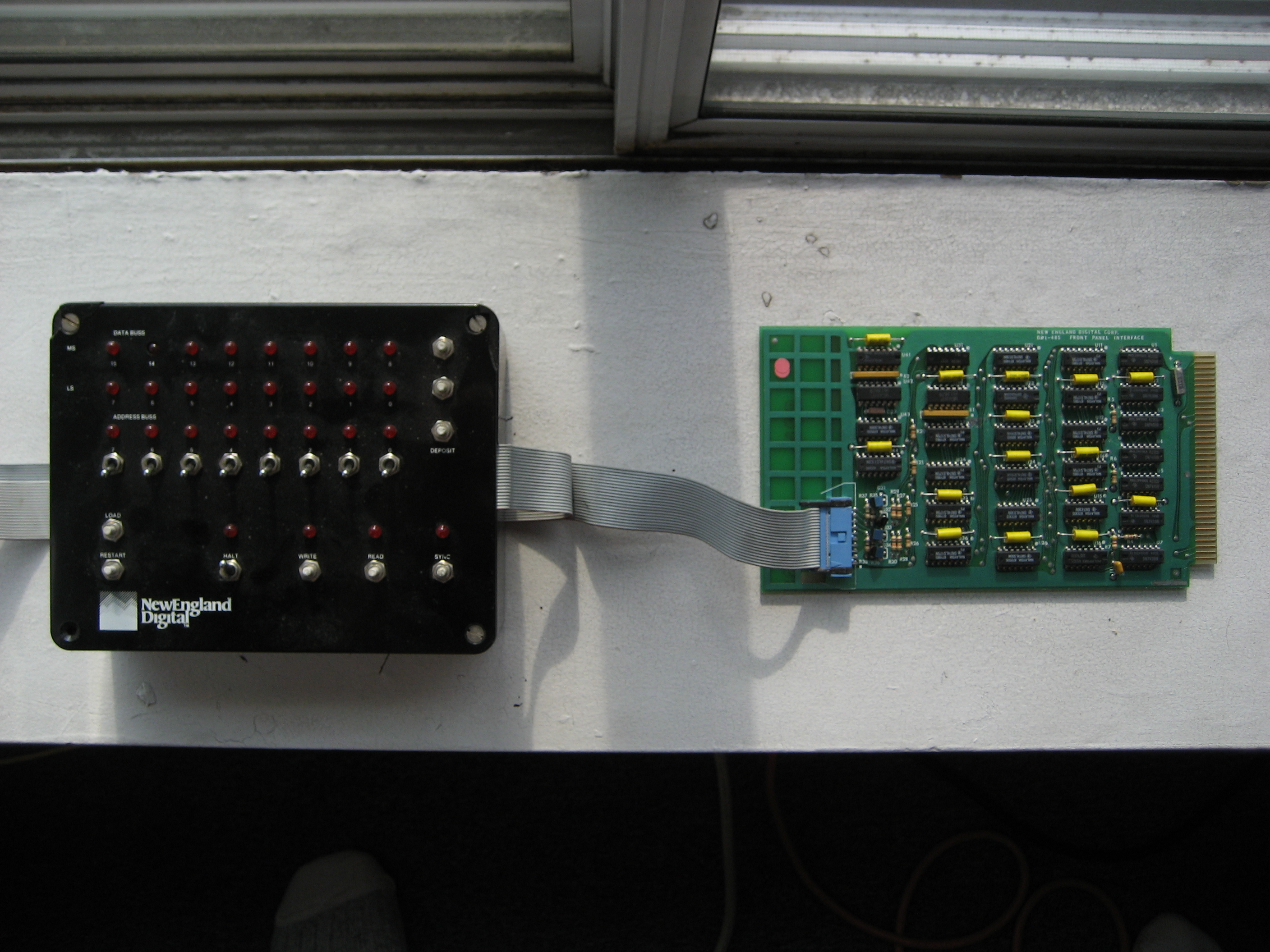
HOP box and D01 card (for interface)

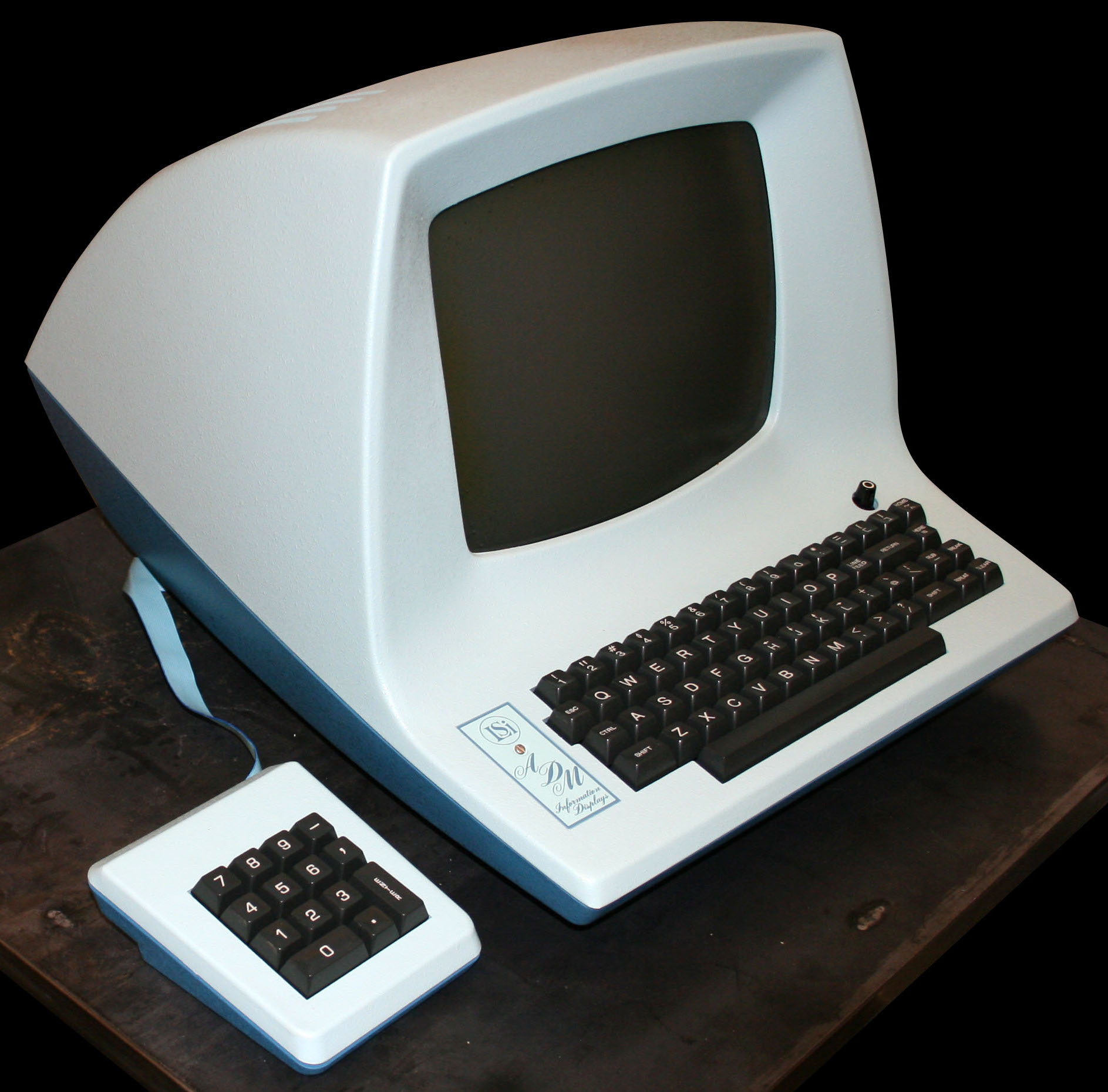
Terminal: ADM-3A (1975)

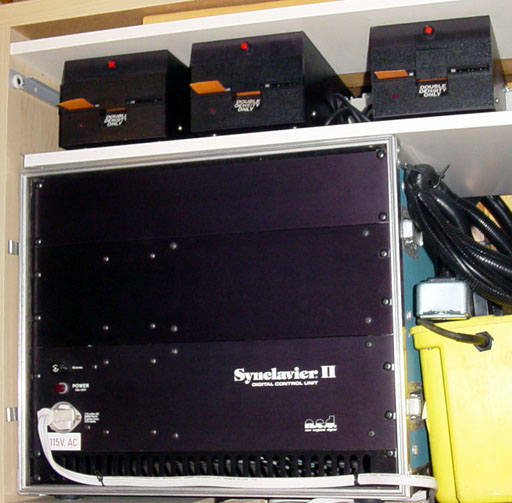
Synclavier II

- Synclavier II (1980): 8-bit additive synthesis with sampling and FM synthesis, 32-track memory recorder, and ORK keyboard. Earlier models were entirely controlled via ORK keyboard with buttons and wheel; a VT100 terminal was subsequently introduced for editing performances. Later models had a VT640 graphic terminal for graphical audio analysis (described below).
  - Original Keyboard (ORK, c.1979): original musical keyboard controller in a wooden chassis, with buttons and silver control wheel on the panel.
  - Sample-to-Disk (STD, c.1982): a first commercial hard disk streaming sampler, with 16-bit sampling at up to 50 kHz.
  - Sample-to-Memory (STM): a later option to sample sounds and edit them in computer memory.
  - Direct-to-Disk (DTD, c.1984): an early commercial hard disk recording system.
  - Signal File Manager: a software program operated via VT640 graphic terminal, enabling additive resynthesis and complex audio analysis.
  - Digital Guitar Interface
  - SMPTE timecode tracking
  - MIDI interface
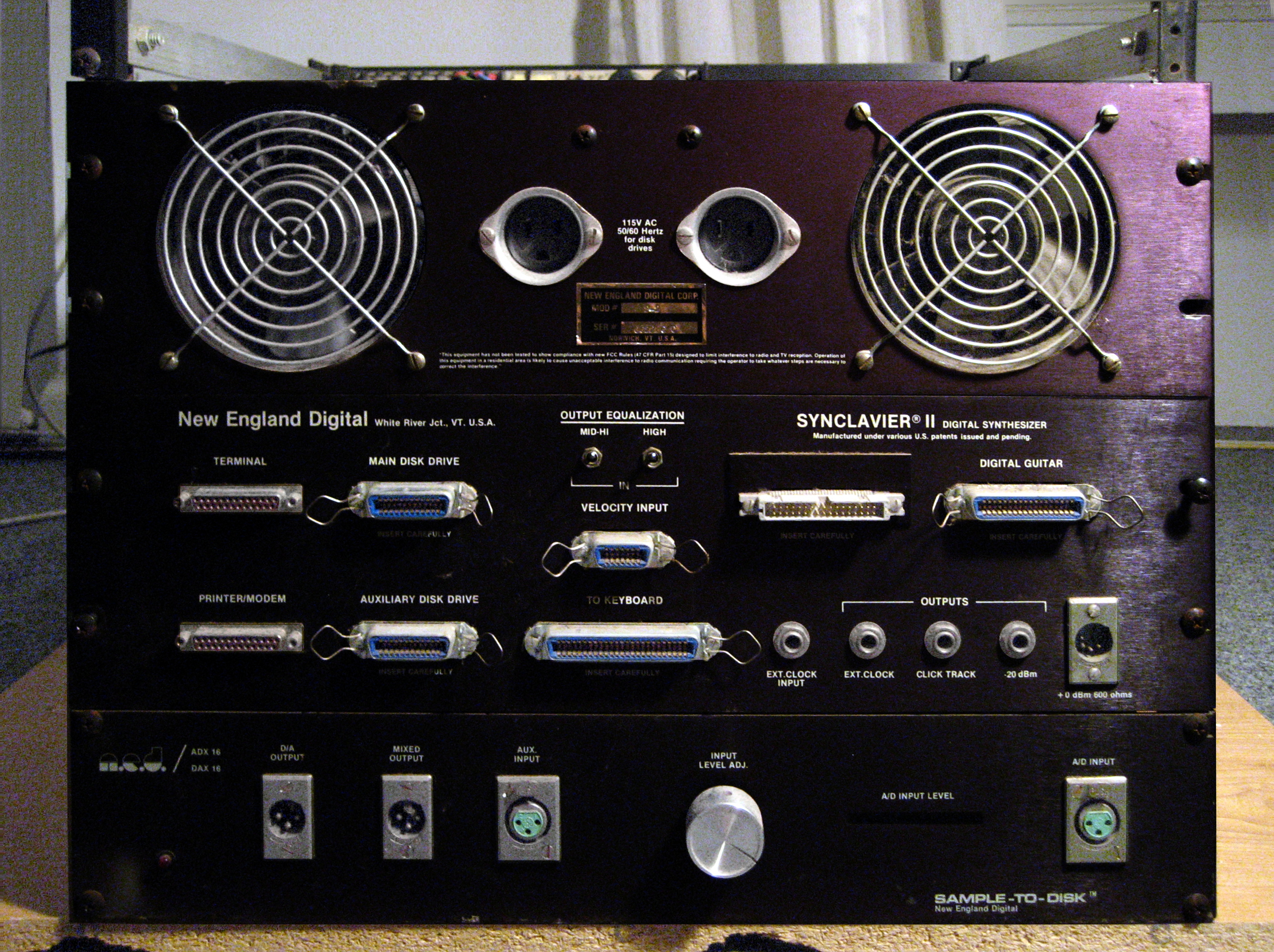
Rear panel of Synclavier II

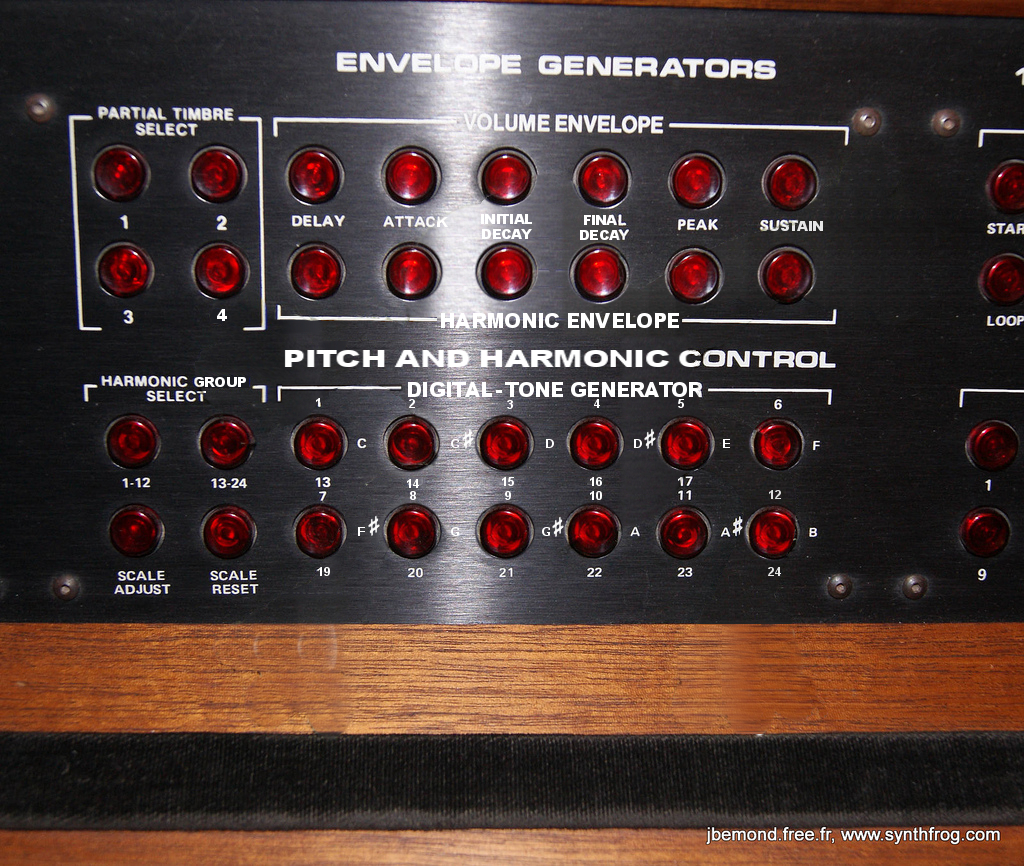
ORK: Original Keyboard (c.1980)

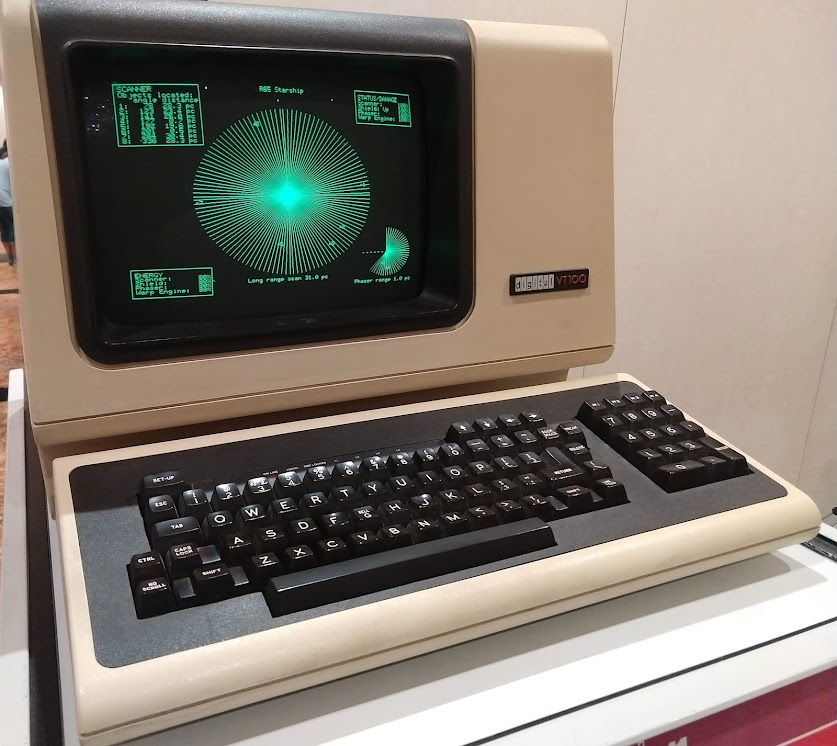
Terminal: DEC VT100 (1978) / VT640

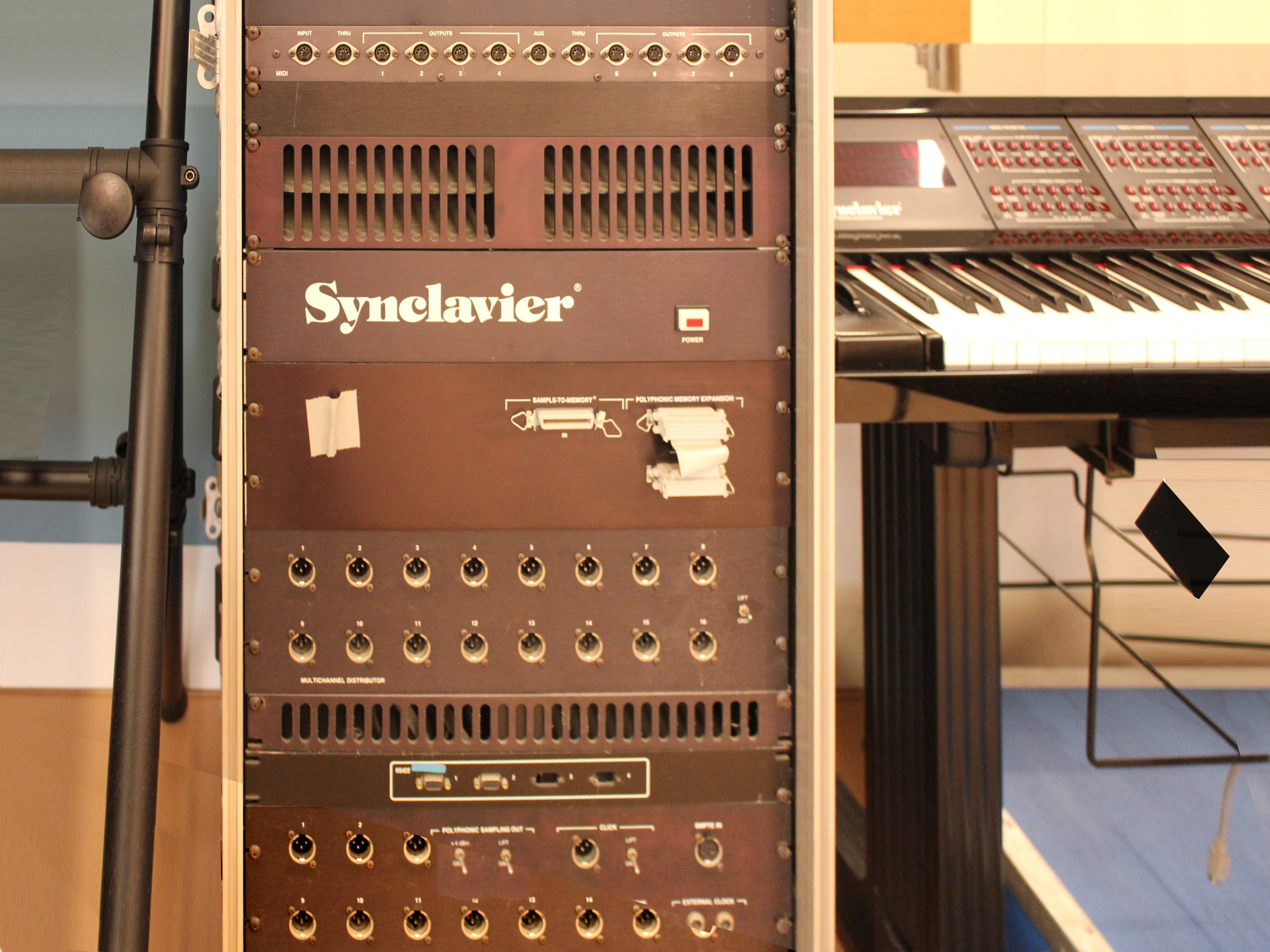
Synclavier PSMT rack (1984)

- Synclavier PSMT (1984): a faster ABLE Model C processor-based system, with a new 'Multi-Channel-Distribution' real-time digitally controlled analog signal routing technology, and 16-bit RAM-based stereo sampling subsystem. The monaural FM voice card was doubled up and enabling software panning for stereo output was introduced.
  - Velocity/Pressure Keyboard (VPK, c.1984): a weighted velocity/after-pressure sensitive musical keyboard controller was introduced. This had a black piano lacquer-finished chassis, a larger display, additional buttons and a silver control wheel.
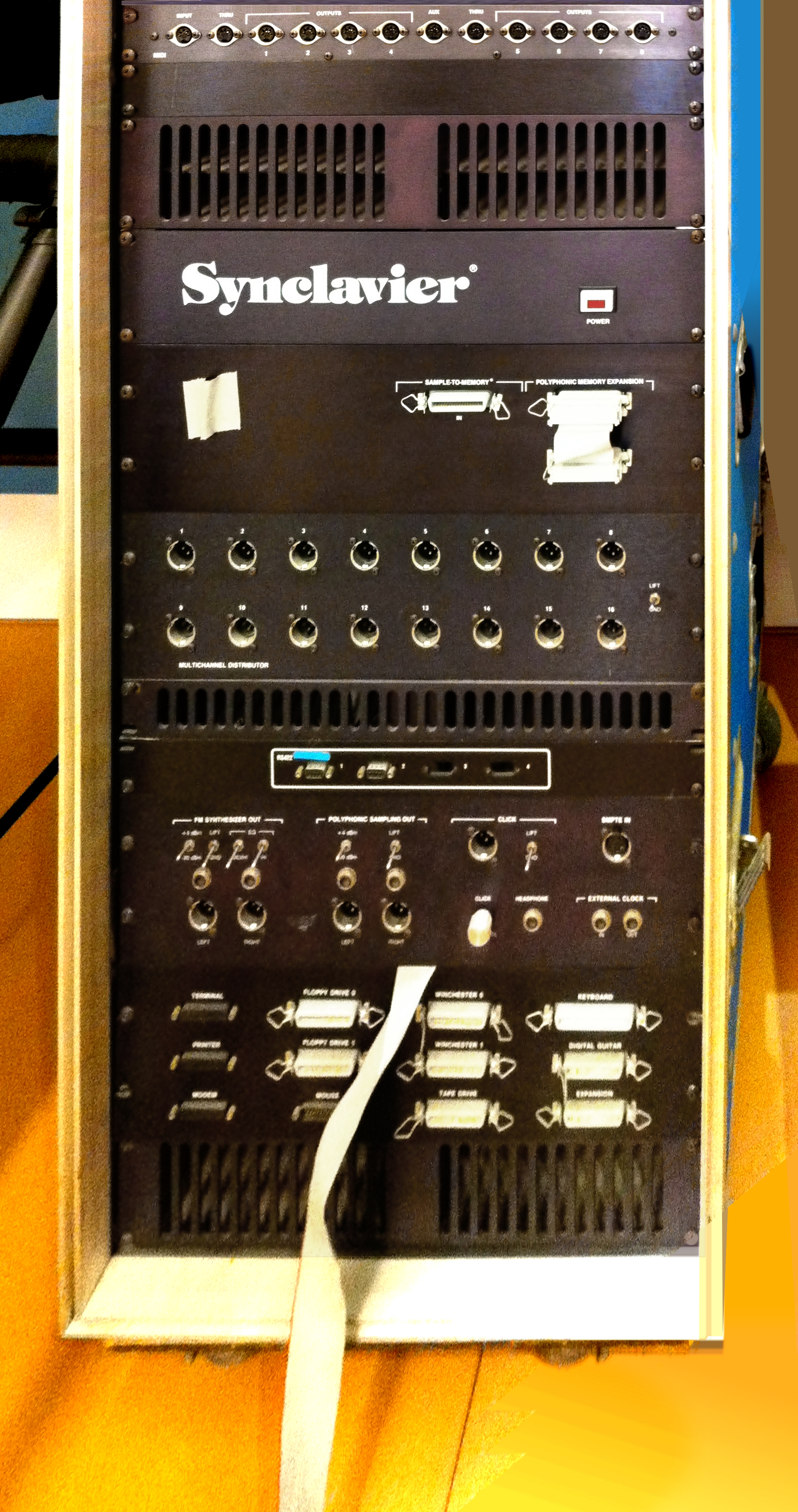
Synclavier PSMT rack

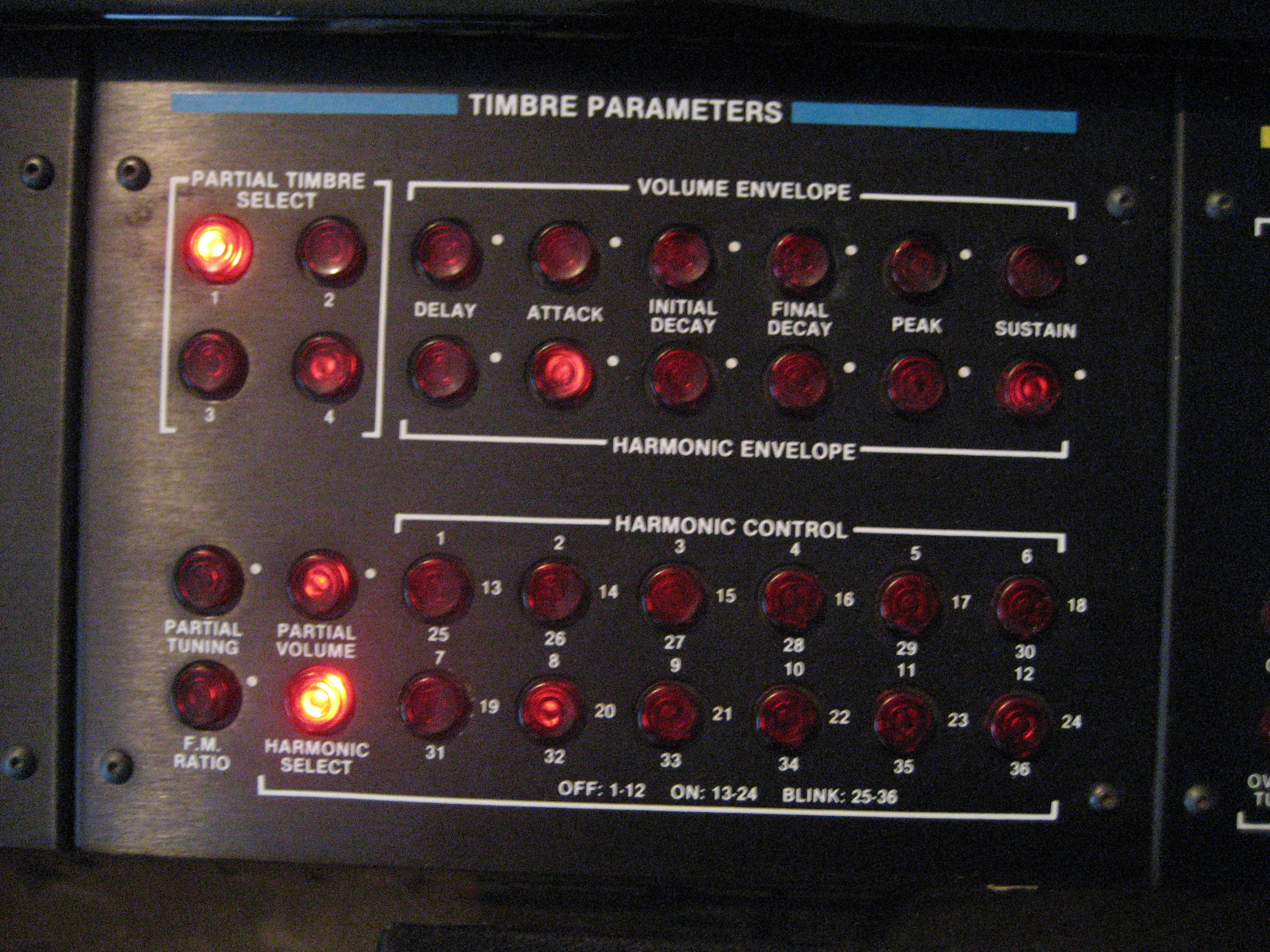
VPK panel (2 of 6)

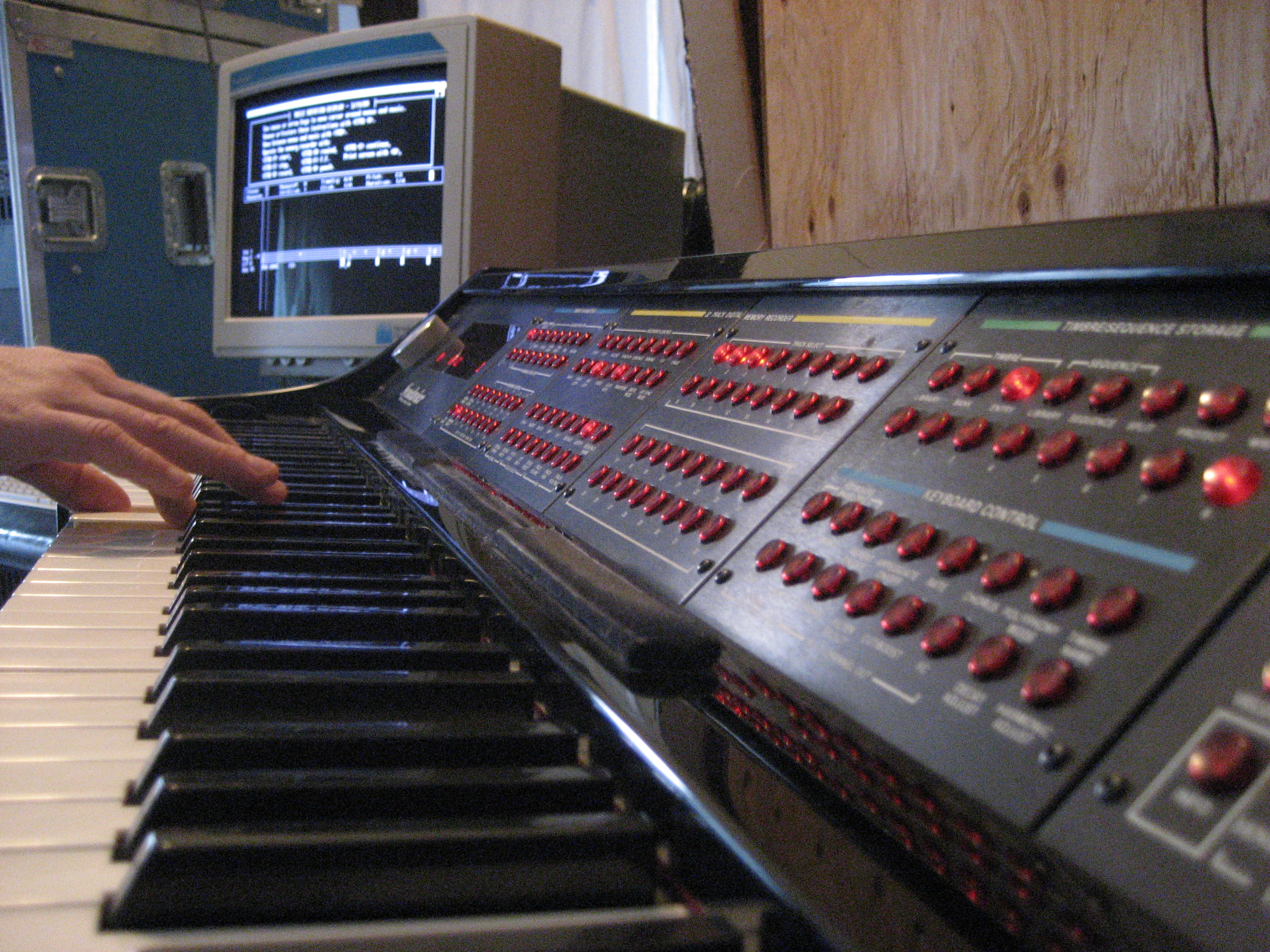
VPK: Velocity Pressure Keyboard (1984)

=== Ivory panel models ===
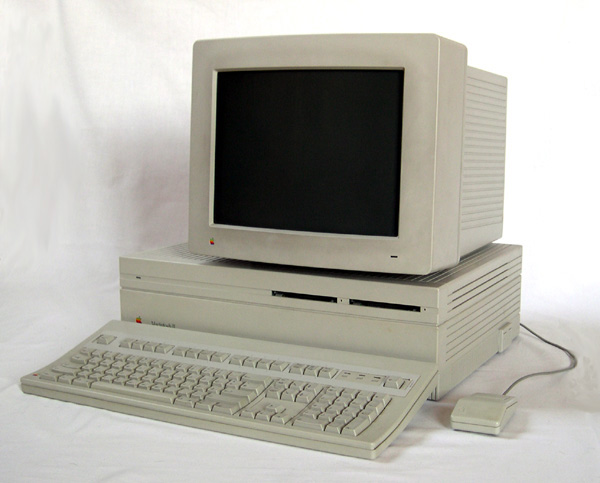
Terminal: Apple Macintosh II (1987)

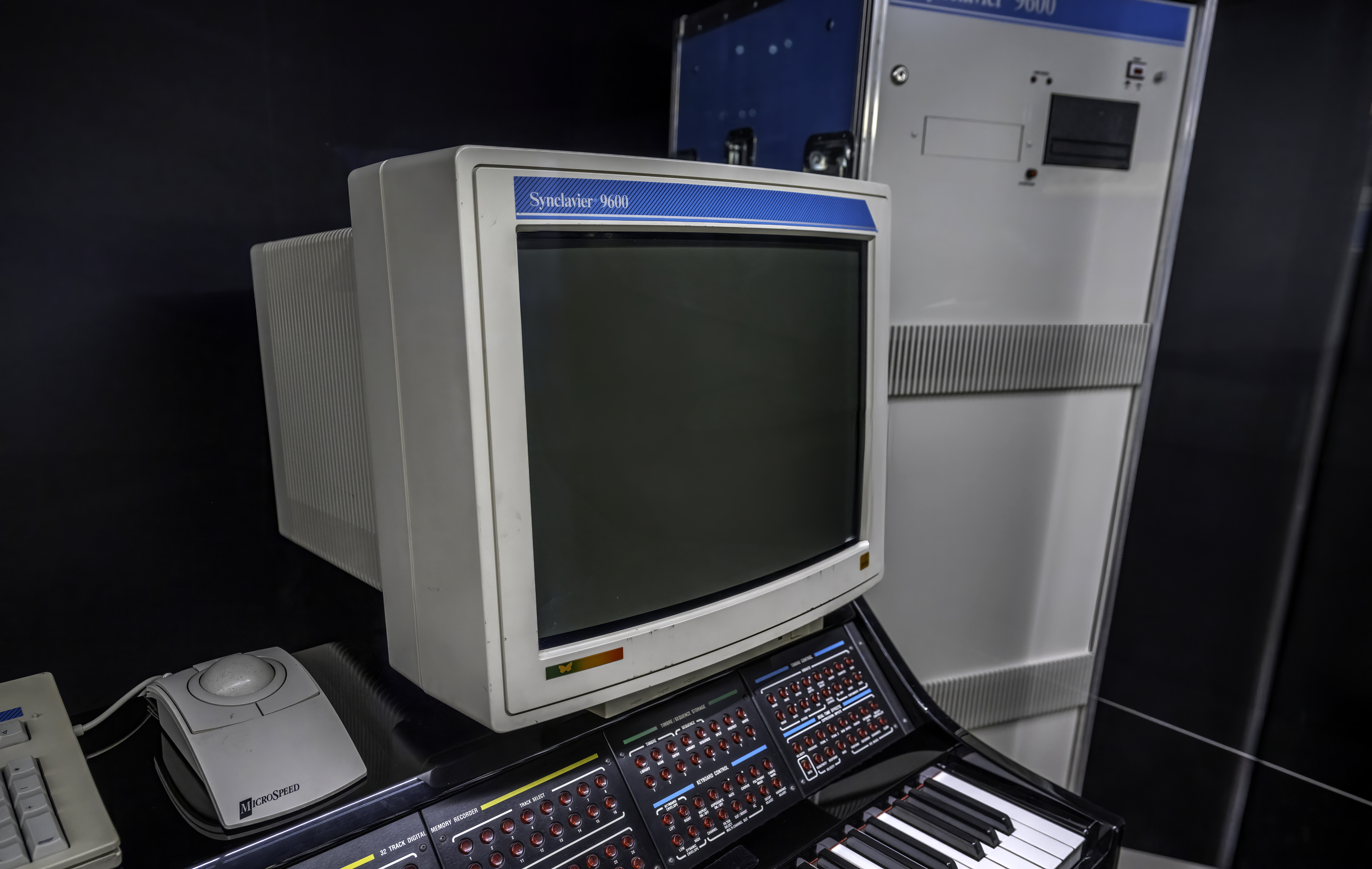
Synclavier 9600 (1988, right)
with CRT monitor on the V/PK

From roughly 1987 to 1993; operated via Macintosh II as terminal.

- Synclavier 3200 (1985)
- Synclavier 6400 (1987?)
- Synclavier 9600 (1988)
- Synclavier TS (Tapeless Studio): consists of Synclavier and Direct-to-Disk
- Synclavier Post Pro: consists of Direct-to-Disk
- Synclavier Post Pro SD (Sound Design): consists of a small Synclavier and Direct-to-Disk

== See also ==
- Fostex Foundation 2000
- WaveFrame AudioFrame
