= FILECOMP =

== BBN Filecomp ==
FILECOMP was a programming language developed at Bolt, Beranek and Newman (BBN). It was one of the three variants of JOSS II - along with TELCOMP and STRINGCOMP - that were developed by BBN 1964-1965. These variants of JOSS provided algebraic programming support and had only primitive string handling functions and no file handling capability. The interpretive language JOSS was developed by J.C. Shaw who worked at Rand Corporation.

The language JOSS and its variant FILECOMP was adopted by Jordan Baruch specifically for the new GE MEDINET project at the Massachusetts General Hospital. A few month after start, GE decided to terminate all of its computer activities including Medinet. The specifications for the Medinet were groundbreaking because they included the basics for a hierarchical global file structure. Subsequently, these ideas influenced the design of MUMPS at the MGH.

== RCA FileComp ==
Filecomp or FileComp was a type composition language that ran on the RCA 1600 computer attached to the RCA Graphic Services Division (GSD) VideoComp CRT typesetter.

The VideoComp was developed by Dr. Rudolf Hell of Kiel, Germany, as the Digiset, and marketed by RCA GSD in the U.S. in the late 1960s and early 1970s as the VideoComp. When RCA got out of the computer business, support of the VideoComp was taken over by Information International, Inc. or Triple I.

Filecomp resembled an odd mix of Fortran, Cobol, Assembly and RCA GSD Page-1 Composition Languages. The user would write a program in Filecomp to read a computer data base or text file and compose it for typeset output.
