= Non-structured programming =

Programming paradigm preceding structured programming

Non-structured programming (a.k.a. unstructured programming) is the programming paradigm that describes the state-of-the-art of programming before the structured programming paradigm was envisioned and involves the use of the goto statement for control flow such as selection (i.e. if/then/else) and iteration (i.e. while and for).

In general, the use of goto, particularly for selection and iteration, is criticized for producing unreadable, spaghetti code in the 1968 open letter Go To Statement Considered Harmful by Dutch computer scientist Edsger W. Dijkstra, who coined the term structured programming.

Any programming language that provides goto can be used to write unstructured code. Notable languages that rely primarily if not exclusively on goto for control flow include JOSS, FOCAL, TELCOMP, any assembly language, batch file, and early versions of BASIC, Fortran, COBOL, and MUMPS.

== Sources ==
- Dijkstra, Edsger W. (March 1968). "Letters to the editor: Go to statement considered harmful" (PDF). Communications of the ACM. 11 (3): 147–148. doi:10.1145/362929.362947. S2CID 17469809. "The unbridled use of the go to statement has as an immediate consequence that it becomes terribly hard to find a meaningful set of coordinates in which to describe the process progress. ... The go to statement as it stands is just too primitive, it is too much an invitation to make a mess of one's program."
