= JOHNNIAC =

Early computer built by the RAND Corporation, in service 1953-1966

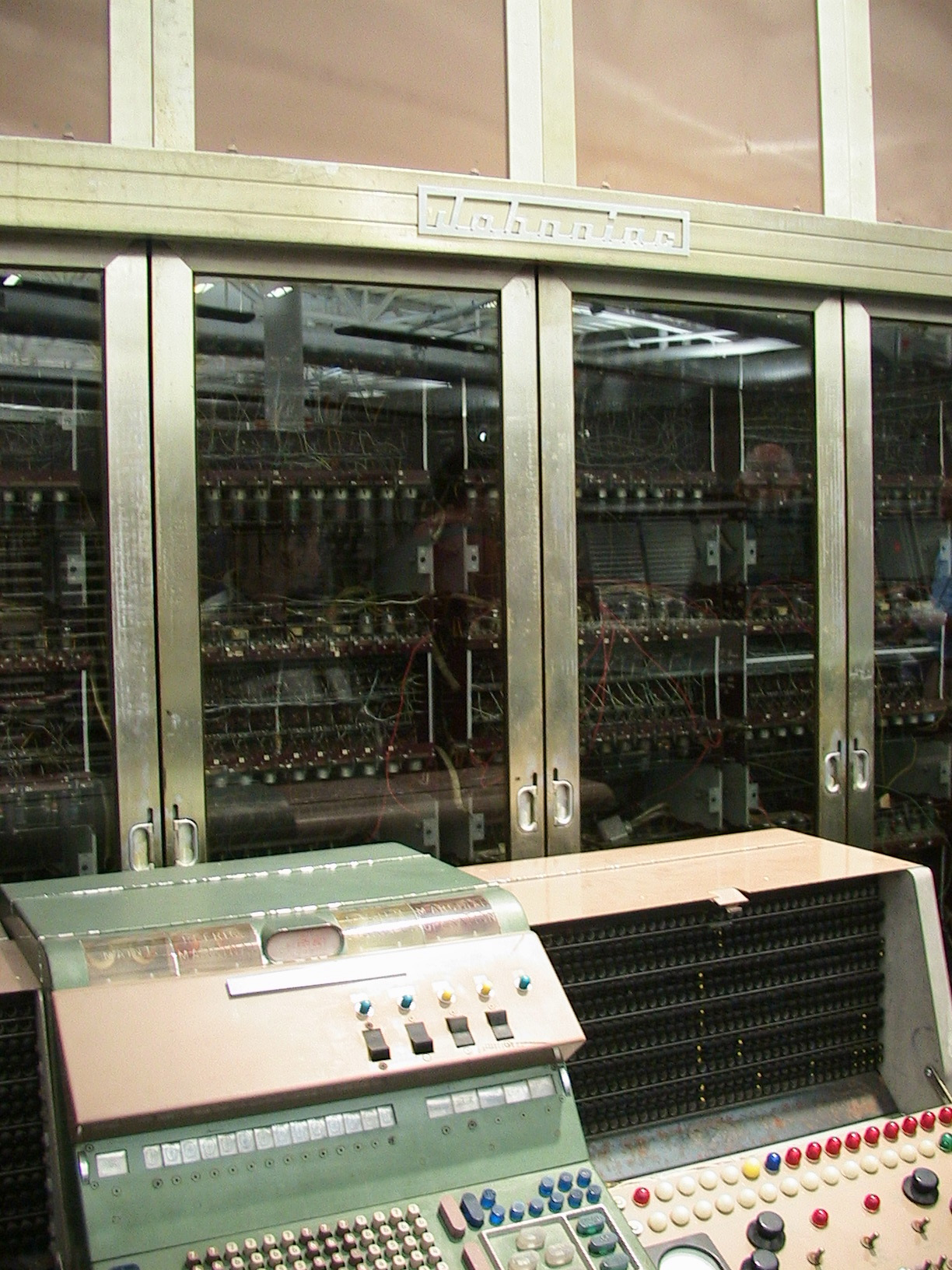
Johnniac computer, Computer History Museum, California

The JOHNNIAC is an early computer built in 1953 by the RAND Corporation (not Remington Rand, maker of the contemporaneous UNIVAC I computer) and based on the von Neumann architecture that had been pioneered on the IAS machine. It was named in honor of von Neumann, short for John von Neumann Numerical Integrator and Automatic Computer.

After being decommissioned in 1966, the machine was taken to the Los Angeles County Museum, which then left it in their parking lot to be picked up as garbage in 1989. It was rescued again and taken to The Computer Museum in Boston. It is currently at the Computer History Museum in Mountain View, California.

Like the IAS machine, JOHNNIAC used 40-bit words. It used Selectron tube main memory at first; each tube held 256 bits of data. It was initially designed to use 80 tubes (512 words) of main memory, but ended up coming into service with only 40 tubes (256 words) of memory. Two instructions were stored in every word in 20-bit subwords consisting of an 8-bit instruction and a 12-bit address, the instructions being operated in series with the left subword running first. The initial machine had 83 instructions. A single register, named A, supplied an accumulator and the machine also featured a register named Q, for quotient. There was only one test condition, whether or not the high bit of the A register was set. There were no index registers, and as addresses were stored in the instructions, loops had to be implemented by modifying the instructions as the program ran. Since the machine had 12 bits of address space but only 8 bits of addressable memory, some of the address bits were unused and were sometimes used for data storage by interleaving data through the instructions.

JOHNNIAC weighed 5,000 pounds (2.5 short tons; 2.3 t).

Numerous modifications were made to the system over its lifetime. In March 1955, 4096 words of magnetic-core memory were added to the system, replacing the earlier Selectrons. This required all 12 bits of addressing, and caused programs that stored data in the "spare bits" to fail. Later in 1955 a 12k-word drum memory secondary storage system was added as well. A transistor-based adder replaced the original tube-based adder in 1956. Numerous changes were made to the input/output peripherals as well, and in 1964, a real-time clock was added to support time-sharing.

One JOHNNIAC legacy was the JOSS programming language (the JOHNNIAC Open Shop System), an easy-to-use language which catered to novices. JOSS was an ancestor of DEC's FOCAL and of MUMPS.

The CYCLONE at Iowa State University was a direct clone of JOHNNIAC, and was instruction compatible with it; the ILLIAC I at the University of Illinois may have been as well. Cyclone was later updated to include hardware for floating-point arithmetic.

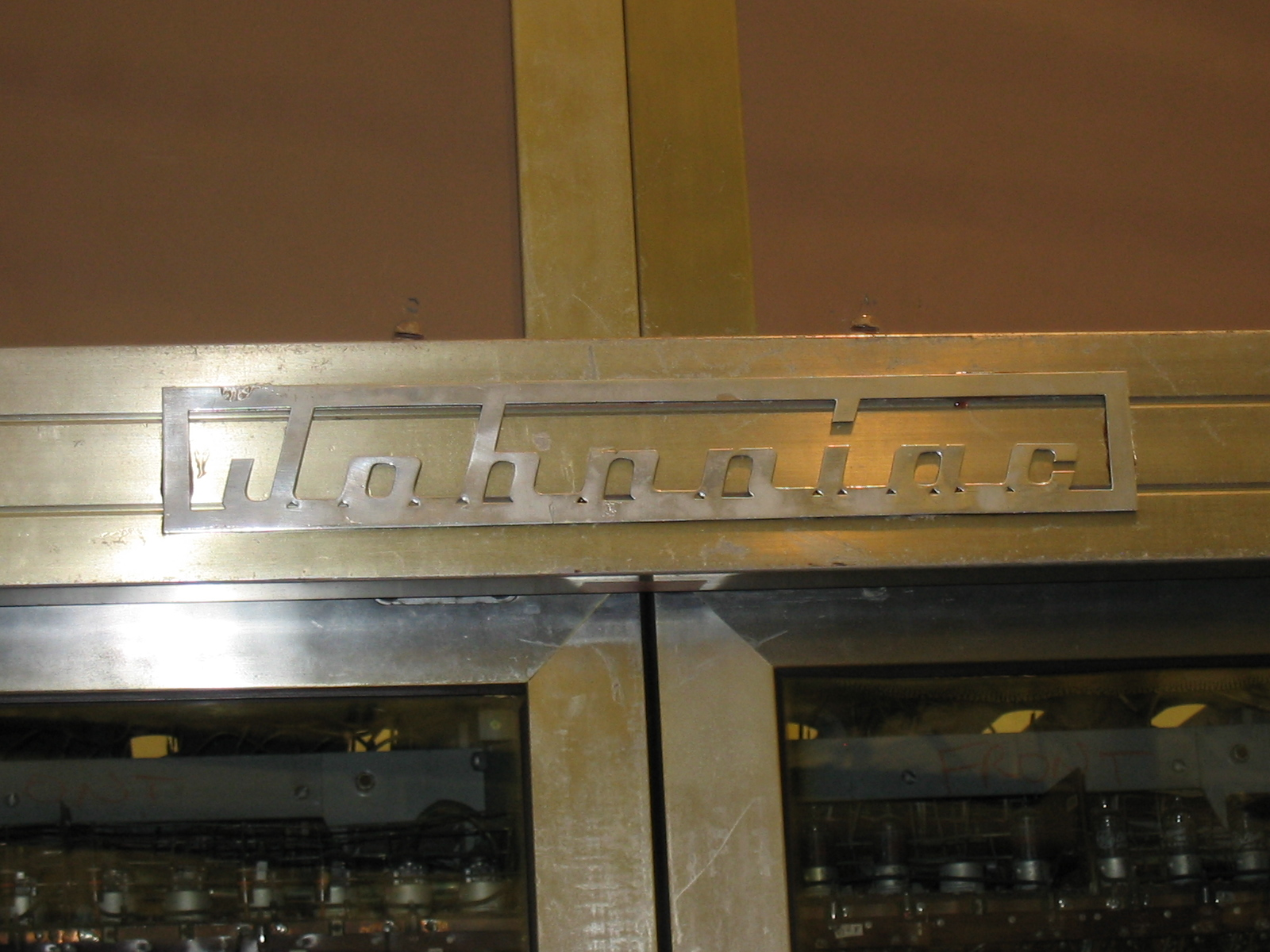
Johnniac name badge on computer frame

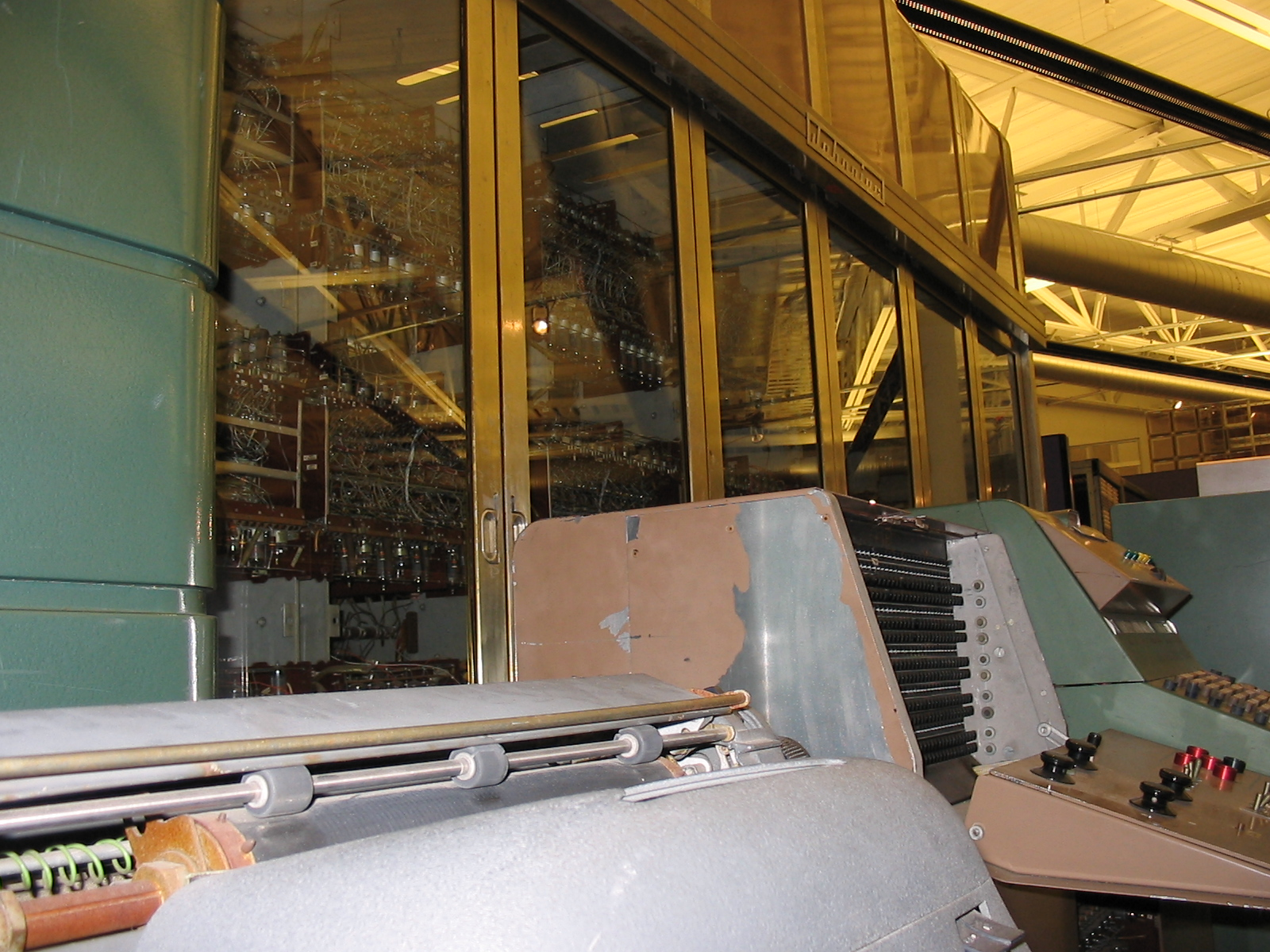
Alternate Johnniac view

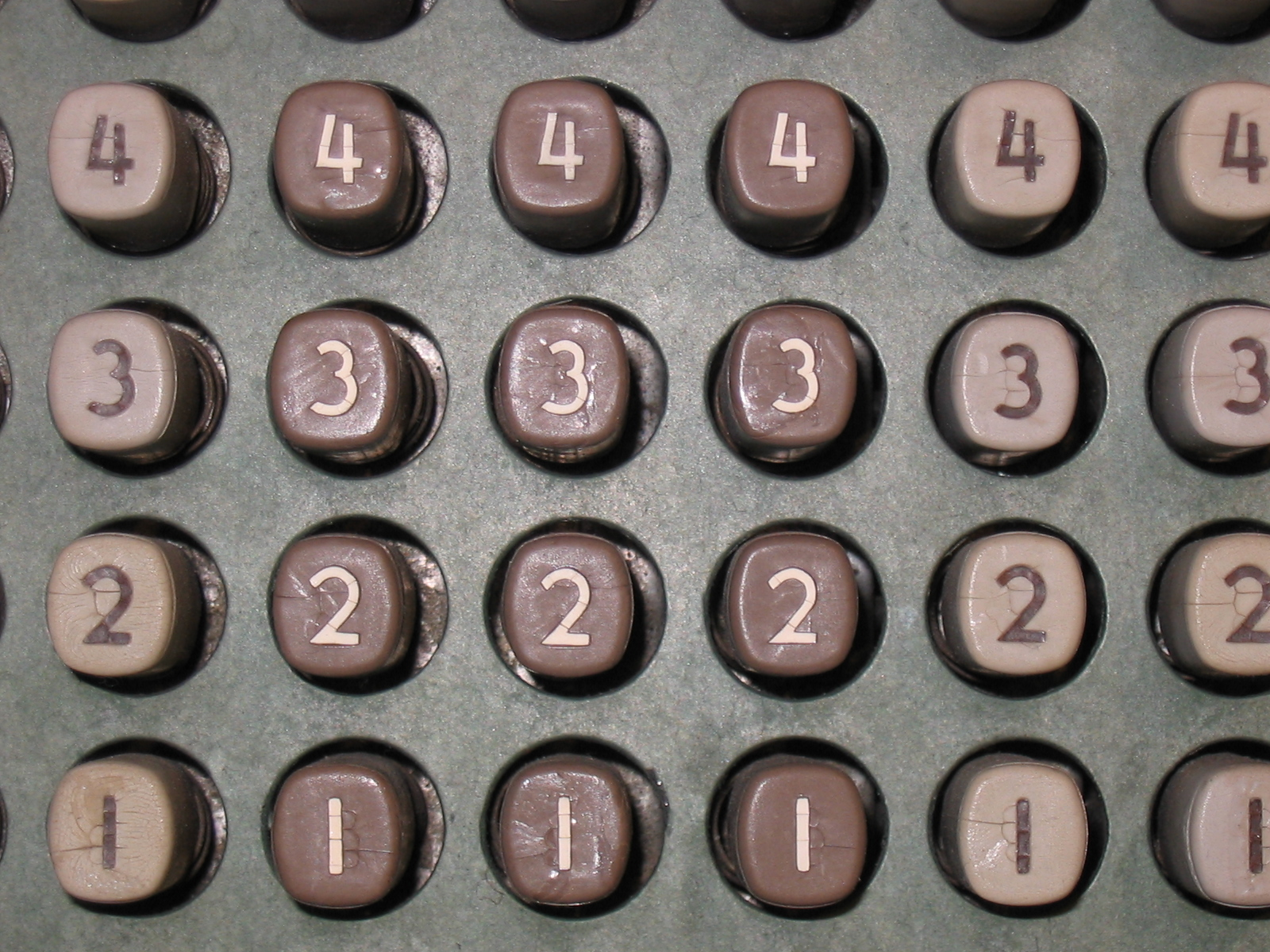
Johnniac keyboard

== See also ==
- List of vacuum-tube computers
