= Applied logic =

Applied logic may refer to:

- Predicate logic, a formal system in mathematical logic
- Applied Logic Corporation, a timesharing company headquartered in Princeton, New Jersey
- Formal methods, techniques for the specification, development, analysis, and verification of software and hardware systems
