= Time Sharing Limited =

Timesharing company (1967–1974)

Time Sharing Limited (TSL) was the United Kingdom's first time sharing computer services company.

== 1st. Generation System ==
Time Sharing Limited (TSL) was founded in 1967 by Richard ("Dick") Evans who had been impressed by Digital Equipment Corporation's minicomputers. It started service from a small office on Great Portland Street, London, with a dual, fault-tolerant system consisting of a front-end switch directing traffic to two units, each consisting of a PDP-7 and a PDP-8. The PDP-7 interpreted messages and the PDP-8 ran the appropriate application. A PDP-9 controlled access to persistent storage based on NCR CRAM Memory. The system used the TELCOMP interpretive language that had been developed by Bolt, Beranek and Newman.

Customers leased a modem from the General Post Office (later British Telecom) and a Westrex Teletype Model 33 from TSL. Line speeds were limited to 110 Baud (about 10 characters per second [CPS]). Customers were charged for each minute that they were logged onto the system. The initial persistent storage system was based on NCR CRAM units, which used magnetic cards hanging from a digitally addressed set of rods.

== Applications ==
TSL quickly developed a range of applications for business, scientific and engineering customers. The most highly used were the PERT application, for critical path network planning, and an embryonic corporate modeling tool that could be regarded as a forerunner to spreadsheets. TSL soon licensed programs from other DEC customers, including the Nastran finite element modeling system and an early Database Management System called Oliver. TSL's Consultancy Division also developed applications, or modified services, for its customers. The most advanced applications used the MACRO-10 assembly language.

== 2nd. Generation System ==
TSL introduced its first high throughput system in early 1970, based on a PDP-10, later known as the DECSystem-10, housed in London offices at the corner of Great Portland Street and Devonshire Street. The service eventually had two powerful systems for continuous service and a third, smaller system as a backup. Storage consisted of disk drives, tape decks and Bryant magnetic drums for swap space. The operating system was TOPS-10. The new service could support batch, remote job entry, time sharing and real-time loads. It was accessible via a range of terminal devices, including 30 CPS Texas Instruments Silent 700 portable units with an acoustic modem and Tektronix storage tubes, which ran at around 2,400 CPS. Fortran II and then COBOL were added in addition to TELCOMP III. Multiplexers were set up in Birmingham and Edinburgh to reduce line charges. Customers were charged for connect time, application usage, file storage, tape and card deck transfers and line printer output.

== Customers and Acquisition ==
By 1973 TSL was well established, with customers that included the Greater London Council, Foster Wheeler, Baring Bros., British Shipbuilding Research Association, Mather & Platt, London Weekend Television, the Metropolitan Police, Unilever, Lloyds and the Royal Signals. Time Sharing Limited was acquired by ADP in 1974.
