= STRINGCOMP =

Programming language

- Developer: BBN

Influenced by
- JOSS

STRINGCOMP was a programming language developed at Bolt, Beranek and Newman (BBN) in 1967.

It was one of the three variants of JOSS II (along with TELCOMP and FILECOMP) that were developed by BBN. It had extended string handling capabilities to augment JOSS's mathematical focus. It was a strong influence in the development of the programming language MUMPS.
