= Applied Logic Corporation =

American computer time-sharing company

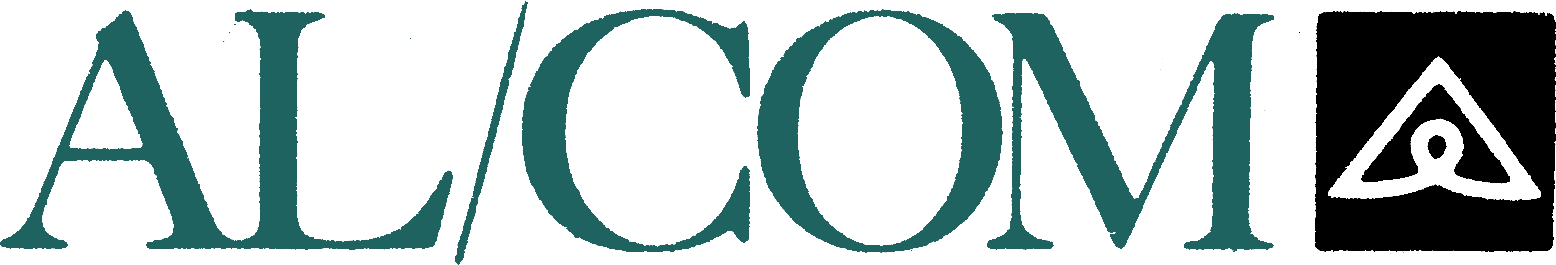
- Industry: Time-sharing computers
- Founded: 1962; 64 years ago in Princeton, New Jersey
- Defunct: 1975
- Fate: Bankruptcy
- Key people: Richard M. Colgate (president)

Applied Logic Corporation (AL/COM) was a time-sharing company in the 1960s and 70s.

Headquartered in Princeton, New Jersey, AL/COM started in 1962 working on "mathematical techniques and their applications to problem-solving."

Seeing the need for in-house time sharing the company bought a Digital Equipment Corporation (DEC) PDP-6 and developed its time sharing service, which came on-line in 1966. In 1968 the company began development of "Mathematics Park" in Montgomery Township, New Jersey, "designed to provide tenants with a computer-serviced and mathematically-oriented environment," adjacent to the Princeton Airport. Also in 1968 the company registered AL/COM as a trademark for its service.

The system involved both custom software and custom hardware, and the service was marketed nationally by a network of associates.

Under the AL-COM Distributor Plan, local computer service firms such as service bureaus, programming, and software firms will be designated as the local AL-COM distributor. The AL-COM distributor will purchase AL-COM computing power at a discount from the Applied Logic Corp., and then in turn sell it at a mark-up.

In the late 1960s, the company developed a system called SAM (Semi-Automated Mathematics) for proving mathematical theories without human intervention. A theorem proved by the system, "SAM's lemma", was "widely hailed as the first contribution of automated reasoning systems to mathematics." The SAM series was one of the first interactive theorem provers and had an influence on subsequent theorem provers.

In 1965 Applied logic acquired a DEC PDP-6 computer system, which became operation in January 1966. By 1969 the company had four DEC PDP-10 dual systems with plans for a fifth, and had expanded nationwide with offices in San Jose, San Diego, and San Francisco. The company also planned to market its time sharing systems in addition to providing services. The company reported sales of $1,200,995, with an operational loss of $63,456.

By 1972 AL/COM had local dial-up facilities in ten cities: Boston, Massachusetts, Buffalo, New York, Chicago, Illinois, Indianapolis, Indiana, Montclair, New Jersey, New York, New York, Philadelphia, Pennsylvania, Princeton, New Jersey, Washington, DC, and Wilmington, Delaware. The computer center was located in Mathematics Park in Princeton.

By late 1969 AL/COM had definite plans for CIT Leasing to leaseback $2.73 million USD of their equipment at Mathematics Park and was considering an additional $7.5 million more. By 1970 the company was in financial difficulty and negotiated an agreement to defer $1,300,000 of debt. Applied Logic filed for Chapter XI bankruptcy in 1975.
