= Time-sharing =

Computing resource shared by concurrent users

In computing, time-sharing is the concurrent sharing of a computing resource among many tasks or users by giving each task or user a small slice of processing time. This quick switch between tasks or users gives the illusion of simultaneous execution. It enables multi-tasking by a single user or enables multiple-user sessions.

Developed during the 1960s, its emergence as the prominent model of computing in the 1970s represented a major technological shift in the history of computing. By allowing many users to interact concurrently with a single computer, time-sharing dramatically lowered the cost of providing computing capability, made it possible for individuals and organizations to use a computer without owning one, and promoted the interactive use of computers and the development of new interactive applications.

== History ==
=== Batch processing ===
The earliest computers were extremely expensive devices, and very slow. Machines were typically dedicated to a particular set of tasks and operated by control panels, the operator manually entering small programs via switches one at a time. These programs might take hours to run. As computers increased in speed, run times dropped, and soon the time taken to start up the next program became a concern. Newer batch processing software and methodologies, including batch operating systems such as IBSYS (1960), decreased these "dead periods" by queuing up programs ready to run.

Comparatively inexpensive card punch or paper tape writers were used by programmers to write their programs "offline". Programs were submitted to the operations team, which scheduled them to be run. Output (generally printed) was returned to the programmer. The complete process might take days, during which time the programmer might never see the computer. Stanford students made a short film humorously critiquing this situation.

The alternative of allowing the user to operate the computer directly was generally far too expensive to consider. This was because users might have long periods of entering code while the computer remained idle. This situation limited interactive development to those organizations that could afford to waste computing cycles: large universities for the most part.

=== Time-sharing ===
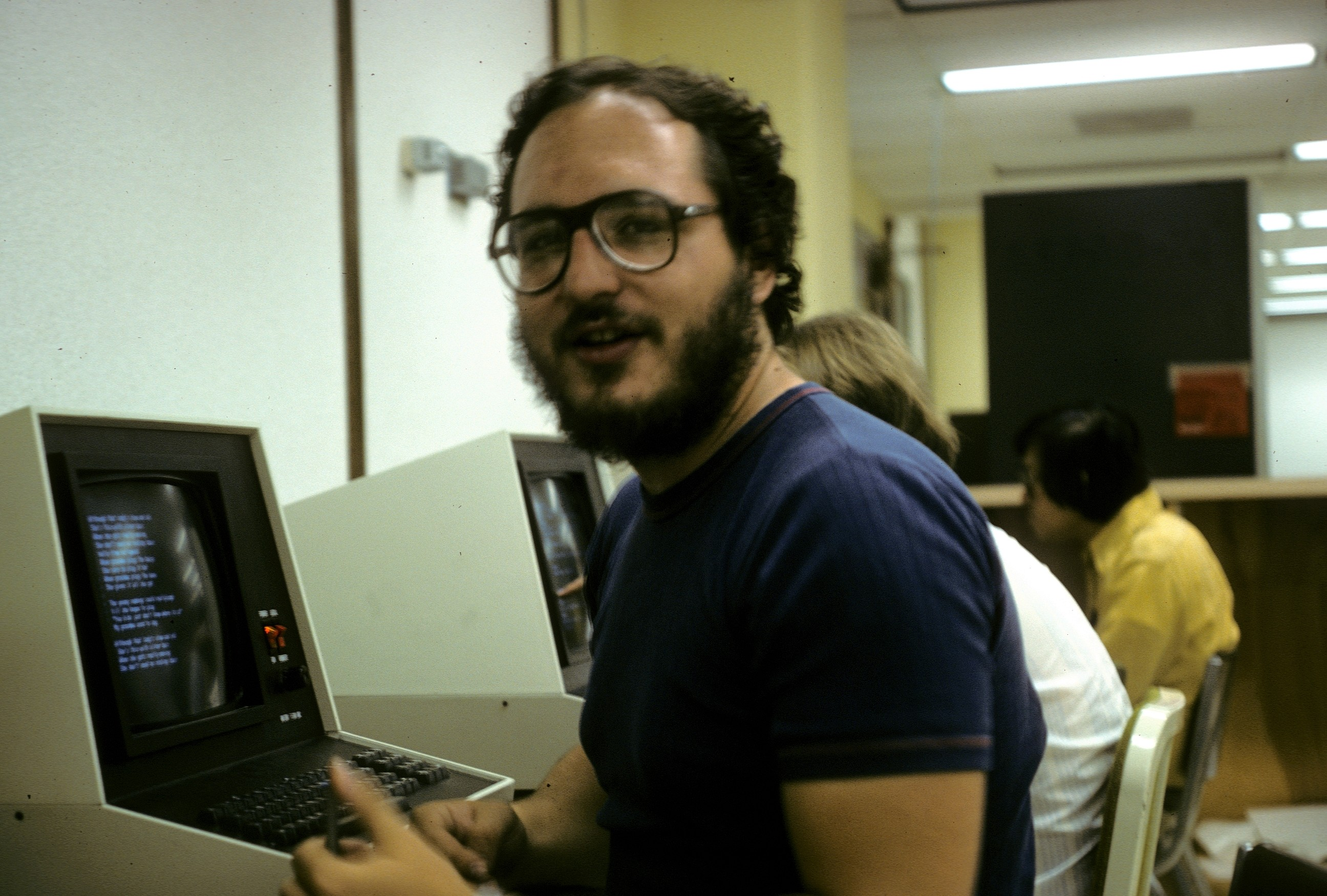
Unix time-sharing at the University of Wisconsin, 1978

The term time-sharing has had two major uses, one prior to 1960 and the other after. In the earliest uses, the term (used without the hyphen) referred to what we now call multiprogramming. Robert Dodds claimed to have been first to describe this form of time sharing in a letter he wrote to Bob Bemer in 1949. Later John Backus described the concept in the 1954 summer session at MIT. In a 1957 article "How to consider a computer" in Automatic Control Magazine, Bob Bemer outlined the economic reasons for using one large computer shared among multiple users, whose programs are “interleaved.” He also proposed a computer utility that would provide computing power to multiple users, similarly to how electricity is provided by power companies. In a paper published in December 1958, W. F. Bauer described how a "parallel system" like LARC or Gamma 60 allowed "large components of the machine [to] be time-shared" and also proposed that large regional computers provide computing power to organizations in their region.

Christopher Strachey, who became Oxford University's first professor of computation, filed a patent application in the United Kingdom for "time-sharing" in February 1959. In June of that year, he gave a paper "Time Sharing in Large Fast Computers" at the first UNESCO Information Processing Conference in Paris, in which he described solutions to various technical problems raised by the idea of time-sharing. At the same conference, he passed the concept on to J. C. R. Licklider of Bolt Beranek and Newman (BBN). This paper was credited by the MIT Computation Center in 1963 as "the first paper on time-shared computers".

After 1960, the meaning of the term time-sharing shifted from its original usage and it came to mean sharing a computer interactively among multiple users. In 1984 Christopher Strachey wrote he considered the change in the meaning of the term time-sharing a source of confusion and not what he meant when he wrote his paper in 1959.

The first interactive, general-purpose time-sharing system usable for software development, Compatible Time-Sharing System, was initiated by John McCarthy at MIT writing a memo in 1959. Fernando J. Corbató led the development of the system, a prototype of which had been produced and tested by November 1961. Philip M. Morse arranged for IBM to provide a series of their mainframe computers starting with the IBM 704 and then the IBM 709 product line IBM 7090 and IBM 7094. IBM loaned those mainframes at no cost to MIT along with the staff to operate them and also provided hardware modifications mostly in the form of RPQs as prior customers had already commissioned the modifications. There were certain stipulations that governed MIT's use of the loaned IBM hardware. MIT could not charge for use of CTSS. MIT could only use the IBM computers for eight hours a day; another eight hours were available for other colleges and universities; IBM could use their computers for the remaining eight hours, although there were some exceptions. In 1963 a second deployment of CTSS was installed on an IBM 7094 that MIT has purchased using ARPA money. This was used to support Multics development at Project MAC.

During the same period, Licklider led the development of the BBN Time-Sharing System, which began operation and was publicly demonstrated in 1962.

JOSS began time-sharing service in January 1964. Dartmouth Time-Sharing System (DTSS) began service in March 1964.

=== Development ===
Throughout the late 1960s and the 1970s, computer terminals were multiplexed onto large institutional mainframe computers (centralized computing systems), which in many implementations sequentially polled the terminals to see whether any additional data was available or action was requested by the computer user. Later technology in interconnections were interrupt driven, and some of these used parallel data transfer technologies such as the IEEE 488 standard. Generally, computer terminals were utilized on college properties in much the same places as desktop computers or personal computers are found today. In the earliest days of personal computers, many were in fact used as particularly smart terminals for time-sharing systems.

DTSS's creators wrote in 1968 that "any response time which averages more than 10 seconds destroys the illusion of having one's own computer". Conversely, timesharing users thought that their terminal was the computer, and unless they received a bill for using the service, rarely thought about how others shared the computer's resources, such as when a large JOSS application caused paging for all users. The JOSS Newsletter often asked users to reduce storage usage. Time-sharing was nonetheless an efficient way to share a large computer. As of 1972 DTSS supported more than 100 simultaneous users. Although more than 1,000 of the 19,503 jobs the system completed on "a particularly busy day" required ten seconds or more of computer time, DTSS was able to handle the jobs because 78% of jobs needed one second or less of computer time. About 75% of 3,197 users used their terminal for 30 minutes or less, during which they used less than four seconds of computer time. A football simulation, among early mainframe games written for DTSS, used less than two seconds of computer time during the 15 minutes of real time for playing the game. With the rise of microcomputing in the early 1980s, time-sharing became less significant, because individual microprocessors were sufficiently inexpensive that a single person could have all the CPU time dedicated solely to their needs, even when idle.

However, the Internet brought the general concept of time-sharing back into popularity. Expensive corporate server farms costing millions can host thousands of customers all sharing the same common resources. As with the early serial terminals, web sites operate primarily in bursts of activity followed by periods of idle time. This bursting nature permits the service to be used by many customers at once, usually with no perceptible communication delays, unless the servers start to get very busy.

=== Time-sharing business ===
==== Genesis ====
In the 1960s, several companies started providing time-sharing services as service bureaus. Early systems used Teletype Model 33 KSR or ASR or Teletype Model 35 KSR or ASR machines in ASCII environments, and IBM Selectric typewriter-based terminals (especially the IBM 2741) with two different seven-bit codes. They would connect to the central computer by dial-up Bell 103A modem or acoustically coupled modems operating at 10–15 characters per second. Later terminals and modems supported 30–120 characters per second. The time-sharing system would provide a complete operating environment, including a variety of programming language processors, various software packages, file storage, bulk printing, and off-line storage. Users were charged rent for the terminal, a charge for hours of connect time, a charge for seconds of CPU time, and a charge for kilobyte-months of disk storage.

Common systems used for time-sharing included the SDS 940, the PDP-10, the IBM 360, and the GE-600 series. Companies providing this service included GE's GEISCO, the IBM subsidiary The Service Bureau Corporation, Tymshare (founded in 1966), National CSS (founded in 1967 and bought by Dun & Bradstreet in 1979), Dial Data (bought by Tymshare in 1968), AL/COM, Bolt, Beranek, and Newman (BBN) and Time Sharing Ltd. in the UK. By 1968, there were 32 such service bureaus serving the US National Institutes of Health (NIH) alone. The Auerbach Guide to Timesharing (1973) lists 125 different timesharing services using equipment from Burroughs, CDC, DEC, HP, Honeywell, IBM, RCA, Univac, and XDS.

==== Rise and fall ====
In 1975, acting president of Prime Computer Ben F. Robelen told stockholders that "The biggest end-user market currently is time-sharing". For DEC, for a while the second largest computer company (after IBM), this was also true: Their PDP-10 and IBM's 360/67 were widely used by commercial timesharing services such as CompuServe, On-Line Systems, Inc. (OLS), Rapidata and Time Sharing Ltd.

The advent of the personal computer marked the beginning of the decline of time-sharing. The economics were such that computer time went from being an expensive resource that had to be shared to being so cheap that computers could be left to sit idle for long periods in order to be available as needed.

===== Rapidata as an example =====
Although many time-sharing services simply closed, Rapidata held on, and became part of National Data Corporation. It was still of sufficient interest in 1982 to be the focus of "A User's Guide to Statistics Programs: The Rapidata Timesharing System". Even as revenue fell by 66% and National Data subsequently developed its own problems, attempts were made to keep this timesharing business going.

==== Time-sharing in the United Kingdom ====
- Time Sharing Limited (TSL, 1969–1974) - launched using DEC systems. PERT was one of its popular offerings. TSL was acquired by ADP in 1974.
- OLS Computer Services (UK) Limited (1975–1980) - using HP & DEC systems.

=== The computer utility ===
Beginning in 1964, the Multics operating system was designed as a computing utility, modeled on the electrical or telephone utilities. In the 1970s, Ted Nelson's original "Xanadu" hypertext repository was envisioned as such a service.

=== Security ===
Time-sharing was the first time that multiple processes, owned by different users, were running on a single machine, and these processes could interfere with one another. For example, one process might alter shared resources which another process relied on such as a variable stored in memory. When only one user was using the system, this could result in a potentially wrong output. With multiple users though, this might mean that other users got to see information they were not meant to see.

To prevent this from happening, an operating system needed to enforce a set of policies that determined which privileges each process had. For example, the operating system might deny access to a certain variable by a certain process.

The first international conference on computer security in London in 1971 was primarily driven by the time-sharing industry and its customers.

Time-sharing in the form of shell accounts has been considered a risk.

== Notable time-sharing systems ==
Significant early timesharing systems:

- Allen-Babcock RUSH (Remote Users of Shared Hardware) Time-sharing System on IBM S/360 hardware (1966)
- APL\360
- AT&T Bell Labs Unix (1971) → UC Berkeley BSD Unix (1977)
- BBN Time-Sharing System (1962) on DEC PDP-1 → Massachusetts General Hospital PDP-1D → MUMPS
- BBN TENEX (1969) → DEC TOPS-20, Foonly FOONEX, MAXC OS at PARC, Stanford Low Overhead TimeSharing (LOTS), which ran TOPS-20
- Berkeley Timesharing System at UC Berkeley Project Genie → Scientific Data Systems SDS 940 (Tymshare, BBN, SRI, Community Memory) → BCC-500
- Burroughs Time-sharing MCP
- Cambridge Multiple Access System was developed for the Titan, the prototype Atlas 2 computer built by Ferranti for the University of Cambridge. This was the first time-sharing system developed outside the United States, and which influenced the later development of UNIX.
- Compower Ltd., a wholly owned subsidiary of the National Coal Board (later British Coal Corporation) in the UK. Originally National Coal Board (NCB) Computer Services, it became Compower in 1973 providing computing and time-share services to internal NCB users and as a commercial service to external users. Sold to Philips C&P (Communications and Processing) in August 1994.
- CompuServe, also branded as Compu-Serv, CIS.
- Compu-Time, Inc., on Honeywell 400/4000, started in 1968 in Ft Lauderdale, Florida, moved to Daytona Beach in 1970.
- CDC MACE, APEX → Kronos → NOS → NOS/VE
- Dartmouth Time-Sharing System (DTSS) → GE Time-sharing → GEnie
- DEC PDP-6 Time-sharing Monitor → TOPS-10
- DEC TSS/8 → RSTS-11, RSX-11 → OpenVMS
- English Electric KDF9 COTAN (Culham Online Task Activation Network)
- HP 2000 Time-Shared BASIC
- HP 3000 series MPE
- IBM CALL/360, CALL/OS - using IBM System/360 Model 50
- IBM CP-40 → CP-67 → CP-370 → CP/CMS → VM/CMS
- IBM TSO for OS/MVT → for OS/VS2 → for MVS → for z/OS
- IBM TSS/360 → TSS/370
- ICT 1900 series GEORGE 3 MOP (Multiple Online Programming)
- International Timesharing Corporation on dual CDC 3300 systems.
- JOSS
- MIT CTSS
- MULTICS (MIT / GE / Bell Labs)
- MIT Time-sharing System for the DEC PDP-1 → ITS
- McGill University MUSIC → IBM MUSIC/SP
- Michigan Terminal System, on the IBM S/360-67, S/370, and successors.
- Michigan State University CDC SCOPE/HUSTLER System
- National CSS VP/CSS, on IBM 360 series; originally based on IBM's CP/CMS.
- Oregon State University OS-3, on CDC 3000 series.
- Prime Computer PRIMOS
- RAND JOSS → JOSS-2 → JOSS-3
- RCA TSOS → Univac / Unisys VMOS → VS/9
- Service in Informatics and Analysis (SIA), on CDC 6600 Kronos.
- System Development Corporation Time-sharing System, on the AN/FSQ-32.
- Stanford ORVYL and WYLBUR, on IBM S/360-67.
- Stanford PDP-1 Time-sharing System → SAIL → WAITS
- Time Sharing Ltd. (TSL) on DEC PDP-10 systems → Automatic Data Processing (ADP), first commercial time-sharing system in Europe and first dual (fault tolerant) time-sharing system.
- Tone (TSO-like, for VS1), a non-IBM Time-sharing product, marketed by Tone Software Co; TSO required VS2.
- Unisys/UNIVAC 1108 EXEC 8 → OS 1100 → OS 2200
- UC Berkeley CAL-TSS, on CDC 6400.
- XDS UTS → CP-V → Honeywell CP-6

== See also ==
- Cloud computing
- The Heralds of Resource Sharing, a 1972 film.
- History of CP/CMS, IBM's virtual machine operating system (CP) that supported time-sharing (CMS).
- IBM M44/44X, an experimental computer system based on an IBM 7044 used to simulate multiple virtual machines.
- IBM System/360 Model 67, the only IBM S/360 series mainframe to support virtual memory.
- Multiseat configuration, multiple users on a single personal computer.
- Project MAC, a DARPA funded project at MIT famous for groundbreaking research in operating systems, artificial intelligence, and the theory of computation.
- TELCOMP, an interactive, conversational programming language based on JOSS, developed by BBN in 1964.
- Timeline of operating systems
- VAX (Virtual Address eXtension), a computer architecture and family of computers developed by DEC.
- Utility computing
- Virtual memory
- Time-sharing system evolution
