= RCA 1600 =

Microcomputer

The RCA 1600 is a discontinued 16-bit minicomputer designed and built by RCA in West Palm Beach, Florida and Marlboro, Massachusetts. It was developed to meet the needs of several RCA divisions, including the Graphics Systems Division (GSD), Instructional Systems, and Global Communications. It was introduced in 1968, and at the time of UNIVAC's purchase of the RCA Computer Division in 1972 the 1600 was estimated to be in use by 40 customers. The 1600 was intended for use in embedded systems, and was retained by UNIVAC and used in products such as the Accuscan supermarket checkout system in the 1970s.

== Description ==
The 1600 uses magnetic-core memory with a cycle time on 1.6μsec, structured as words of 18 bits—16 data bits, one parity bit, and one memory protection bit. Four configurations offered memory sizes of 8 K, 16 K, 32 K, and 64 K bytes (4, 8, 16, and 32 KW). Individual words of memory can be protected by setting the associated protection bit. Attempts to store into protected memory are trapped if memory protection is enabled by a console switch.

The processor has sixteen 16-bit "standard" registers, eight for each program state. Program state one is used for normal execution, program state two is used for interrupt service routines. Because each state has an independent set of registers, switching states can be done "essentially instantaneously." Register 8 is the instruction counter in both states. If high-speed I/O (cycle stealing) is used, registers 6 and 7 in program state two are used for I/O address and byte count respectively. The architecture defines 29 instructions in three groups. All instructions are 16 bits, must be located on a word boundary, and therefore can be accessed in one machine cycle of 1.6μsec. There are also seven "special" registers serving particular functions which can also be read and written programmatically.
