= TELCOMP =

Interactive programming language for time-sharing computer systems (1964-74)

- Developer: BBN
- First appeared: 1965

Influenced by
- JOSS

Influenced
- MUMPS

TELCOMP was a programming language developed at Bolt, Beranek and Newman (BBN) in about 1964 and in use until at least 1974. BBN offered TELCOMP as a paid service, with first revenue in October 1965. The service was sold to On-Line Systems, Inc. (OLS) in 1972. In the United Kingdom, TELCOMP was offered by Time Sharing, Ltd. (TSL), a partnership between BBN and an entrepreneur named Richard Evans.

It was an interactive, conversational language based on JOSS, developed by BBN after Cliff Shaw from RAND visited the labs in 1964 as part of the NIH survey. It was first implemented on the PDP-1 and was used to provide a commercial time sharing service by BBN in the Boston area and later by Time Sharing Ltd. in the United Kingdom.

In 1996, Leo Beranek said "We even developed a programming language called TELCOMP that to this day, some say was better than the programming language that the industry adopted, namely BASIC."

There were at least three versions: TELCOMP I, TELCOMP II, and TELCOMP III.

TELCOMP I was implemented on the PDP-1, TELCOMP II on the PDP-7 and TELCOMP III on the PDP-10, running on DEC 's TOPS-10 operating system or on BBN's own TENEX operating system.

TELCOMP programs were normally input via a paper tape reader on a Teletype Model 33, which would be connected to a PDP via a modem and acoustic telephone line. Data could be read from the paper tape reader or from the Teletype keyboard. Output was either printed to the Teletype or sent to the paper tape punch. Early versions had no facility for on-line storage of programs or data.

During data input using a Teletype, the user would type a response to a printed prompt. If, instead of hitting Return, the user hit Tab ↹, another, possibly computed, prompt would be printed on the same line. This process could be repeated for the full width of the line. This unusual feature allowed very compact data entry, comparable to full-screen CRT data entry. It saved paper, and the input section of the form became part of the program's printed output.

A later derivative of TELCOMP called STRINGCOMP was oriented towards string handling. Another BBN JOSS-derivative called FILECOMP was developed for the GE MEDINET system, which was cancelled. The implicit file handling system it contained was influential on the MUMPS global database system.

The initial research for LOGO was carried out in TELCOMP, but only the JOSS-style errors and interaction made it through to the actual language.

== Commands ==
A TELCOMP program was made up of numbered lines, each line referred to as a Step. Steps were grouped into Parts. Each line contained one instruction.

 DEMAND    Read input from the teletype
 DO PART   Execute all of the steps in a numbered part and then return
 DO STEP   Execute a single line and return
 DONE      Stop execution of current part and return to caller
 IF        Condition, suffixed to any instruction
 FOR       Loop, suffixed to any instruction
 PLOT      Type output to the teletype in the form of a graph
 PRINT     Print output to the teletype
 READ      Read input from the paper tape reader
 SEND      Send output to the paper tape punch
 SET       Assign a variable to the value of an expression
 STOP      Stop execution completely
 TO PART   Go to a specified part
 TO STEP   Go to a specified line
 TYPE      Emulate teletype input while in stored operation mode (like the TCL/TK Expect functionality)
 ;         Comment, suffixed to any line
 FORM      A specification for formatted output (not really a command)

== Sample Program ==
 1.04 TYPE #,"ENTER ONE OF THE FOLLOWING:-";MENU
 1.05 TYPE FORM X FOR X=1:1:4 FOR END=10^15
 1.06 READ GRNO IN FORM 15
 1.065 DONE IF GRNO=END
 1.07 TO STEP 1.06 IF GRNO>4
 1.08 TO PART GRNO+1
 
 2.01 DO PART 50
 2.02 READ N,K
 2.03 DO PART 51
 2.04 TO PART 15
 
 ..
 
 15.01 LINE FOR X=1:1:3
 15.02 TYPE MINPL,MAXPL IN FORM 17
 15.03 TYPE FORM 17
 15.04 DO PART GRNO+15 FOR X=MNPL:STPL:MXPL
 
 16.01 Y=(X^N)+K
 16.02 Y1[X]=(((Y-MNPL)/(MXPL-MNPL))*2)-1
 
 ..
 
 FORM 15
 ITEM NUMBER?   #####
 FORM 17
 MINIMUM ##### MAXIMUM ######
