= Afara Websystems =

American computer company

- Afara Websystems
- Founders: Kunle Olukotun, Fermi Wang, Les Kohn
- Type: Server company
- Headquarters: Sunnyvale, California

Afara Websystems Inc. was an American server and semiconductor company based in Sunnyvale, California. It developed high-throughput, SPARC-based microprocessor technology and server systems designed for large-scale web and network applications. The name “Afara” is derived from the Yoruba language, meaning “bridge”.

The company was acquired by Sun Microsystems in July 2002, and its technology contributed to the development of the UltraSPARC “Niagara” processor family.

== History ==
The company was founded by Kunle Olukotun, a Stanford University professor. First employee to be hired was by Raza Foundries Board Member - Atul Kapadia. Neil Sadaranganey was the sole business person at Afara Web Systems. He was hired out of Real Networks. Subsequently, Les Kohn (employee #2), a microprocessor designer for: Sun Microsystems UltraSPARC; Intel i860 and i960; National Semiconductor Swordfish took the basic idea and developed a product plan.

Olukotun was talking with people running data centers in 2000 and understood the problem of those centers running out of power and space. Olukotun believed that multiple processors on a chip in conjunction with multi-threading could resolve those problems. Olukotun searched for venture capital support on the basis that a new architecture could lead to a 10x performance increase in server processing capabilities. Pierre Lamond, a partner at Sequoia Capital, introduced Olukotun to microprocessor architect Les Kohn, who designed microprocessors for Sun, Intel and National Semiconductor (where Les worked for Pierre). Les introduced Fermi Wang (a journeyman) one of his colleagues at C-Cube Microsystems, to be the acting CEO and to lead the company. It was a classic Silicon Valley startup - the headcount grew to 100 with 95 engineers to focus on engineering development and one marketing director.

Two meetings with venture capitalists were scheduled on September 11, 2001. The meetings in New York City were interrupted by the terrorist attack on the World Trade Center, but one of them resumed 2 days later. Available capital for funding the server company had vanished, as the economy started to dip into a new recession in 2001.

Rick Hetherington left Sun to create a start-up company. Venture capitalists Sequoia Capital introduced Hetherington to Olukotun. When Hetherington's startup failed, he returned to Sun. Hetherington wrote memos to Mike Splain, CTO of the Processor group at Sun, encouraging technology acquisition of Afara Websystems. Hetherington became Chief Architect for Horizontal Systems at Sun, which develops and sells servers for data centers and Web systems.

Although SPARC-based computers systems are almost exclusively deployed with Solaris, Afara instead planned to use Linux on the SPARC-based processor it developed.

The search for venture capital continued, since creating a server company requires substantial resources, but there was little available during the recession following 9/11. Afara began negotiations with Sun Microsystems, and the acquisition was consummated in July 2002. This new acquisition fell under the umbrella of Fred DeSantis, the vice president of engineering for horizontal systems at Sun. During the due-diligence process, Brian Sutphin sensed (as in Fermi Wang, the "CEO" mentioned that there were no term sheets on the table) from executives he was interacting with that Afara did not have any alternate sources of funding and reduced the offer from high triple digit millions of dollars to < $500M.

== Contributions and impact ==
The project included many technology contributions among Linux, Solaris and SPARC. The Afara CPU used a SPARC port of Debian GNU/Linux initially. Debian GNU/Linux contributions to Afara Websystem's former CPU architecture continued to grow, including commercial support for Ubuntu, a Debian GNU/Linux-based operating system. Afara Websystems' former platform direction seemed further validated when Sun hired Ian Murdock, founder of the Debian distribution, to head operating system platform strategy, and cross-pollinate Solaris with a new OS packaging technology similar to that of Debian GNU/Linux.

The new CPU architecture of Afara Websystems, which became known as "Niagara", had enough merit to cause a competing internal Sun project under DeSantis' organization, called "Honeybee", to be canceled.

Pressure was placed on the computing industry to add cores and threads. While competing microprocessor vendors were designing dual-core chips with two dual-threads per core, the original "Niagara" architecture was a more radical design: an eight core processor with four threads per core.

The new family of SPARC microprocessors, trademarked by Sun as "CoolThreads", was released with model names of UltraSPARC T1 (2005), UltraSPARC T2 (2007), UltraSPARC T2 Plus (2008) and the further derivative UltraSPARC T3 (2010). While SPARC is an open instruction set architecture, where vendors build their own processors to an open specification defined by SPARC International, this new family of microprocessors was not only created to the open specification, but its implementation was now free, where people could download the source code, and manufacture them independently.

For web serving loads, Sun had catapulted to become the uncontested fastest single processor on the planet in December 2005, performing 7x faster than the closest Intel server, and has been consistently the highest throughput web server, with the closest competition being 2x-3x slower (socket to socket comparison) as of mid-2009.

Oracle Corporation announced its intention to acquire Sun in April 2009, a deal which closed in January 2010. By the end of 2010, market competitors started to release similar products with multiple cores, a less radical approach to threading, but with similar performance characteristics. Oracle continued the radical approach of the original Afara SPARC architecture (large numbers of threads per large number of simple cores) with the release of the SPARC T3 processor in September 2010 - the first 16 core commodity central processing unit, yielding another top performance benchmark, but only by a slim margin.

Olokotun returned to Stanford University to head its "Pervasive Parallelism Lab" in 2008, to help shape the future of software, as he did with hardware.

Fermi Wang and Les Kohn founded Ambarella with a focus on high definition video capture and delivery markets.
