= Sun Blade =

Sun Microsystems modular compute servers

Sun Blade is a line of blade server computer systems sold by Sun Microsystems from 2006 onwards.

In June 2006, Sun announced the AMD Opteron-based Sun Blade 8000 modular blade server system. The Sun Blade 8000 chassis can hold up to 10 Sun Blade X8420 or X8440 modules.

In July 2007, Sun launched the Sun Blade 6000 Modular System. This allowed up to 10 mixed UltraSPARC and x64 architecture blades. The Sun Blade T6300 and T6320 modules run Solaris and use UltraSPARC T1 and UltraSPARC T2 processors respectively, while the Sun Blade X6220 and X6250 modules use AMD Opteron or Intel Xeon 5000-series processors respectively.

In November 2007, Sun announced the Sun Blade 6048 Modular System, supporting up to 48 UltraSPARC, AMD Opteron and/or Intel Xeon blades.

The X-series blades support Solaris, Oracle Linux, RHEL, SLES, Windows Server or VMware.
