= SPARC T series =

Range of multi-core microprocessors

The SPARC T-series, aka sun4v, family of RISC processors and server computers, based on the SPARC V9 architecture, was originally developed by Sun Microsystems, and later by Oracle Corporation after its acquisition of Sun. Its distinguishing feature from earlier SPARC iterations is the introduction of Hyper-Privileged execution mode and Chip Multithreading Technology (CMT), a multithreading, multicore design intended to drive greater processor utilization at lower power consumption.

The first generation T-series processor, the UltraSPARC T1, and servers based on it, were announced in December 2005. As later generations were introduced, the term "T series" was used to refer to the entire family of processors.

== Pre-Oracle era ==
Sun Microsystems' Sun Fire and SPARC Enterprise product lines were based on early generations of CMT technology. The UltraSPARC T1 based Sun Fire T2000 and T1000 servers were launched in December 2005 and early 2006, respectively. They were later rebranded to match the name of the UltraSPARC T2 and T2 Plus based Sun SPARC Enterprise T5**0 servers.

== SPARC T3 ==
In September 2010, Oracle announced a range of SPARC T3 processor based servers. These are branded as the "SPARC T3" series, the "SPARC Enterprise" brand being dropped.

The SPARC T3-series servers include the T3-1B, a blade server module that fits into the Sun Blade 6000 system. All other T3 based servers are rack mounted systems. Subsequent T-series server generations also include a blade server in the same Sun Blade 6000 form factor.

== SPARC T4 ==
On September 26, 2011, Oracle announced a range of SPARC T4-based servers. These systems use the same chassis as the earlier T3 based systems. Their main features are very similar, with the exception of:

- T4 CPU instead of T3 CPU, with complete core redesign
- doubled RAM capacity
- small changes in mass storage capacity

== SPARC T5 ==
On March 26, 2013, Oracle announced refreshed SPARC servers based on the new SPARC T5 microprocessor, which the company claims is "the world's fastest". In the T5 range of servers, the single socket rackmount server design was deprecated, while a new eight-socket rackmount server was introduced.

== SPARC M7 ==
On October 26, 2015, Oracle announced a family of systems built on the 32-core, 256-thread SPARC M7 microprocessor. Unlike prior generations, both T- and M-series systems were introduced using the same processor. The M7 included the first generation of the Data Analytics Accelerator (DAX) engines. DAX engines offloaded in-memory query processing and performed real-time data decompression.

== SPARC M8 ==
On September 18, 2017, Oracle announced a family of systems built on the 32-core, 256-thread SPARC M8 microprocessor at 5.0 GHz. It also included the second generation of Data Analytics Accelerator (DAX) engines.

== Partitioning and virtualization ==
SPARC T-series servers can be partitioned using Oracle's Logical Domains technology. Additional virtualization is provided by Oracle Solaris Zones (aka Solaris Containers) to create isolated virtual servers within a single operating system instance. Logical Domains and Solaris Zones can be used together to increase server utilization.

== Servers ==
Model	RU	Max processors	Processor frequency	Max memory	Max disk capacity	GA date
Sun Fire T1000	1	1× UltraSPARC T1	1.0 GHz	32 GB	1× 3.5" SATA or 2× 2.5" SAS	March 2006
Sun Fire T2000	2	1× UltraSPARC T1	1.0 GHz	64 GB	4× 2.5" SAS	December 2005
SPARC Enterprise T5120	1	1× UltraSPARC T2	1.2, 1.4 GHz	128 GB	8× 2.5" SAS	November 2007
SPARC Enterprise T5140	1	2× UltraSPARC T2 Plus	1.2, 1.4 GHz	128 GB	8× 2.5" SAS	April 2008
SPARC Enterprise T5220	2	1× UltraSPARC T2	1.2, 1.4 GHz	128 GB	16× 2.5" SAS	November 2007
SPARC Enterprise T5240	2	2× UltraSPARC T2 Plus	1.2, 1.4 GHz	256 GB	16× 2.5" SAS	April 2008
SPARC Enterprise T5440	4	4× UltraSPARC T2 Plus	1.2, 1.4 GHz	512 GB	4× 2.5" SAS	Oct 2008
SPARC T3-1	2	1× SPARC T3	1.65 GHz	128 GB	16× 2.5" SAS	Sep 2010
SPARC T3-1B	na (blade)	1× SPARC T3	1.65 GHz	128 GB	2× 2.5" SAS	Sep 2010
SPARC T3-2	3	2× SPARC T3	1.65 GHz	256 GB	6× 2.5" SAS	Sep 2010
SPARC T3-4	5	4× SPARC T3	1.65 GHz	512 GB	8× 2.5" SAS	Sep 2010
SPARC T4-1	2	1× SPARC T4	2.85 GHz	256 GB	8× 2.5" SAS	Sep 2011
SPARC T4-1B	na (blade)	1× SPARC T4	2.85 GHz	256 GB	2× 2.5" SAS	Sep 2011
SPARC T4-2	3	2× SPARC T4	2.85 GHz	512 GB	6× 2.5" SAS	Sep 2011
SPARC T4-4	5	4× SPARC T4	3.0 GHz	1024 GB	8× 2.5" SAS	Sep 2011
SPARC T5-1B	na (blade)	1× SPARC T5	3.6 GHz	256 GB	2× 2.5" SAS	Mar 2013
SPARC T5-2	3	2× SPARC T5	3.6 GHz	1 TB	6× 2.5" SAS	Mar 2013
SPARC T5-4	5	4× SPARC T5	3.6 GHz	2 TB	8× 2.5" SAS	Mar 2013
SPARC T5-8	8	8× SPARC T5	3.6 GHz	4 TB	8× 2.5" SAS	Mar 2013
SPARC T7-1	2	1× SPARC M7	4.13 GHz	1 TB	8× 2.5" SAS-3	Oct 2015
SPARC T7-2	3	2× SPARC M7	4.13 GHz	2 TB	6× 2.5" SAS-3	Oct 2015
SPARC T7-4	5	4× SPARC M7	4.13 GHz	4 TB	8× 2.5" SAS	Oct 2015
SPARC M7-8	10	8x SPARC M7	4.13 GHz	8 TB	NIL (PCIE NVMe or SAN boot)	Oct 2015
SPARC T8-1	2	1× SPARC M8	5.0 GHz	1 TB	8× 2.5" SAS	Sep 2017
SPARC T8-2	3	2× SPARC M8	5.0 GHz	2 TB	6× 2.5" SAS	Sep 2017
SPARC T8-4	6	4× SPARC M8	5.0 GHz	4 TB	8× 2.5" SAS	Sep 2017
SPARC M8-8	10	8x SPARC M8	5.0 GHz	8 TB	NIL (PCIE NVMe or SAN boot)	Sep 2017
