= SPARC Enterprise =

Server computer product line

The SPARC Enterprise series is a range of UNIX server computers based on the SPARC V9 architecture. It was co-developed by Sun Microsystems and Fujitsu, announced on June 1, 2004, and introduced in 2007. They were marketed and sold by Sun Microsystems (later Oracle Corporation, after their acquisition of Sun), Fujitsu, and Fujitsu Siemens Computers under the common brand of "SPARC Enterprise", superseding Sun's Sun Fire and Fujitsu's PRIMEPOWER server product lines. Codename is APL (Advanced Product Line).

Since 2010, servers based on new SPARC CMT processors (SPARC T3 and later) have been branded as Oracle's SPARC T-Series servers, the "SPARC Enterprise" brand being dropped. Fujitsu continued to sell SPARC T-Series as their SPARC Enterprise product line until December 2015. Fujitsu rebranded the product line to "SPARC Servers" since SPARC M10 released in 2013 and continued to sell SPARC M-Series and T-Series with their new brand.

== Model range ==
| Model | Height, RU | Max. processors | Processor frequency | Max. memory | Max. disk capacity | GA date |
|---|---|---|---|---|---|---|
| M3000 | 2 | 1× SPARC64 VII or VII+ | 2.52, 2.75 GHz (VII) or 2.86 GHz (VII+) | 64 GB | 4× 2.5-inch SAS | October 2008 (2.52 GHz), February 2010 (2.75 GHz), April 2011 (VII+) |
| M4000 | 6 | 4× SPARC64 VI or VII or VII+ | 2.15 GHz (VI), 2.53 GHz (VII), or 2.66 GHz (VII+) | 256 GB | 2× 2.5-inch SAS | April 2007 (VI), July 2008 (VII), December 2010 (VII+) |
| M5000 | 10 | 8× SPARC64 VI, VII or VII+ | 2.15 GHz (VI), 2.53 GHz (VII), or 2.66 GHz (VII+) | 512 GB | 4× 2.5-inch SAS | April 2007 (VI), July 2008 (VII), December 2010 (VII+) |
| M8000 | N/A | 16× SPARC64 VI, VII, or VII+ | 2.28, 2.4 GHz (VI), 2.52, 2.88 GHz (VII), or 3.0 GHz (VII+) | 1024 GB | 16× 2.5-inch SAS | April 2007 (VI), July 2008 (VII), December 2010 (VII+) |
| M9000 | N/A | 32 or 64× SPARC64 VI, VII, or VII+ | 2.28, 2.4 GHz (VI), 2.52, 2.88 GHz (VII), or 3.0 GHz (VII+) | 4096 GB | 64× 2.5-inch SAS | April 2007 (VI), July 2008 (VII), December 2010 (VII+) |
| T1000 | 1 | 1× UltraSPARC T1 | 1.0 GHz | 32 GB | 1× 3.5-inch SATA or 2× 2.5-inch SAS | March 2006 |
| T2000 | 2 | 1× UltraSPARC T1 | 1.0, 1.2, 1.4 GHz | 64 GB | Up to 4× 2.5-inch SAS | December 2005 |
| T5120 | 1 | 1× UltraSPARC T2 | 1.2, 1.4 GHz | 128 GB | Up to 8× 2.5-inch SAS | November 2007 |
| T5140 | 1 | 2× UltraSPARC T2+ | 1.2, 1.4 GHz | 128 GB | Up to 8× 2.5-inch SAS | April 2008 |
| T5220 | 2 | 1× UltraSPARC T2 | 1.2, 1.4, 1.6 GHz | 128 GB | Up to 16× 2.5-inch SAS | November 2007 |
| T5240 | 2 | 2× UltraSPARC T2+ | 1.2, 1.4, 1.6 GHz | 256 GB | Up to 16× 2.5-inch SAS | April 2008 |
| T5440 | 4 | 4× UltraSPARC T2+ | 1.2, 1.4, 1.6 GHz | 512 GB | Up to 4× 2.5-inch SAS | Oct 2008 |

=== SPARC64 processor based models (M-series) ===
The midrange and high-end SPARC64 VI, SPARC64 VII, SPARC64 VII+ processor based servers are designated "M-series". The "M" indicates RAS features similar to mainframe class machines.

- M3000 - 1 processor socket, 2U rack-mount
- M4000 - Up to 4 processor sockets, 6U rack-mount
- M5000 - Up to 8 processor sockets, 10U rack-mount
- M8000 - Up to 16 processor sockets, one data center rack
- M9000 - Up to 64 processor sockets, one or two data center racks

==== Processor types ====
The SPARC64 VI is a dual-core processor, with each core featuring two-way vertical multi-threading (VMT). A M9000 server configured with the maximum number of processors supports running 256 concurrent threads. VMT is a coarse-grained multi-threading implementation. Each core in the SPARC64 VI can handle two strands or threads. VMT switches execution from one strand to the other on the basis of events. To execute instructions from another thread, the pipeline must be saved/flushed and switched to the registers for the other thread. These events include L2 cache misses, a hardware timer exception, interrupts, or some multi-threading-related control instructions. This is also called Switch On Event (SOE) threading.

In 2008, Fujitsu released the SPARC64 VII, a quad-core processor, with each core featuring two-way simultaneous multi-threading. Existing M-class servers will be able to upgrade to the SPARC64 VII processors in the field.

In 2010, Fujitsu released the SPARC64 VII+, running at higher frequency and with a larger L2 cache than its predecessor. A SPARC64 VII or SPARC64 VII+ processor module includes four physical cores, where each core can execute two threads. Each physical core is able to run both threads simultaneously. With SMT, there is no context-switch time and the two threads share the instruction pipeline smoothly. When both are ready to run, they alternate cycles for superscalar instruction issue, and share the functional units according to need.

An important capability of the M-Series is the ability to mix processor generations and clock speeds in the same system and domain. All M-Series servers can have both SPARC64 VI and SPARC64 VII CPUs installed and they will run at their native speeds, with no clocking down to the slowest CPU.

==== Benchmark record ====
On April 17, 2007, a Sun SPARC Enterprise M9000 achieved 1.032 TFLOPS on the LINPACK benchmark, making it the fastest single system supercomputer at that time.

On May 2, 2008, Sun SPARC Enterprise M9000 server achieved a world performance record on the TPC-H data warehousing benchmark at the 1 terabyte scale factor using the Oracle Database.

As of February 19, 2009, the SPARC Enterprise M8000 holds the 64-thread world performance records on the SPEC OMP2001 benchmark, both for medium and for large

=== UltraSPARC T processor based models (T-series) ===
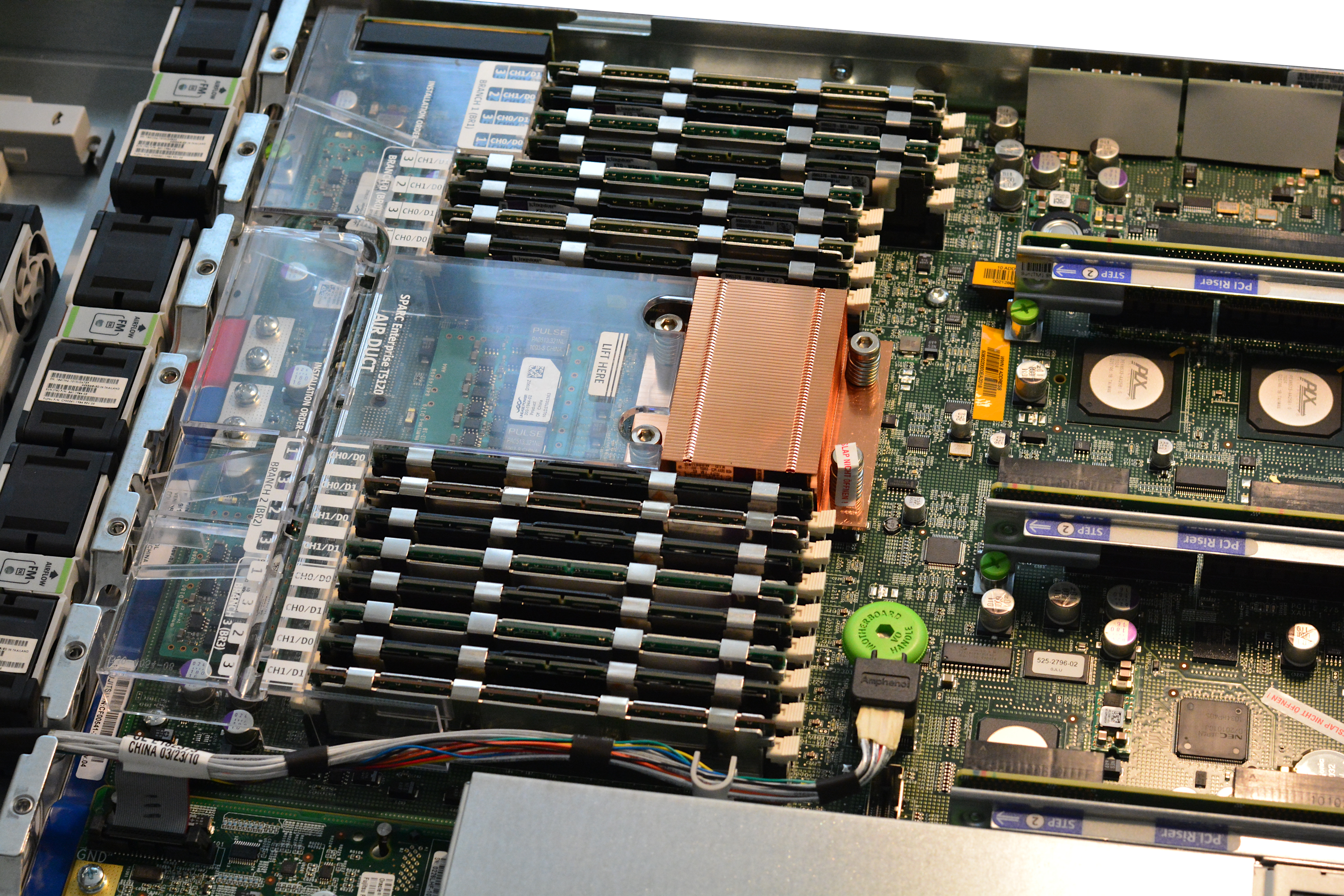
T5120 mainboard with UltraSPARC T2 and FB-DIMM memory

The UltraSPARC T1-based Sun Fire T1000 and T2000 are rebranded to SPARC Enterprise:

- T1000 - 1 processor socket, 1U rack-mount
- T2000 - 1 processor socket, 2U rack-mount

In October 2007, Sun added the UltraSPARC T2-based servers to the SPARC Enterprise line:

- T5120 - 1 processor, 1U rack-mount
- T5220 - 1 processor, 2U rack-mount

In April 2008, Sun added the UltraSPARC T2 Plus-based servers to the SPARC Enterprise line:

- T5140 - 2 processor, 1U rack-mount
- T5240 - 2 processor, 2U rack-mount

In October 2008, Sun released the 4-way SMP UltraSPARC T2 Plus-based server:

- T5440 - 4 processor, 4U rack-mount

== Operating systems ==
SPARC Enterprise models are licensed to run Solaris 10 and Solaris 11.

== Partitioning and virtualization ==
The M-series supports Dynamic Domains and Dynamic Reconfiguration, which enable a single machine to be divided into multiple electrically isolated partitions.

The UltraSPARC T1, UltraSPARC T2/T2+ models partition the system using Logical Domains.

Both M-series and T-series models support Solaris Containers, which supports a maximum of 8191 non-global zones in each Dynamic Domain or Logical Domain.
