= OpenSPARC =

Open-source hardware project

OpenSPARC is an open-source hardware project, started in December 2005, for CPUs implementing the SPARC instruction architecture. The initial contribution to the project was Sun Microsystems' register-transfer level (RTL) Verilog code for a full 64-bit, 32-thread microprocessor, the UltraSPARC T1 processor. On March 21, 2006, Sun released the source code to the T1 IP core under the GNU General Public License v2. The full OpenSPARC T1 system consists of 8 cores, each one capable of executing four threads concurrently, for a total of 32 threads. Each core executes instructions in order and its logic is split among 6 pipeline stages.

On December 11, 2007, Sun also made the UltraSPARC T2 processor's RTL available via the OpenSPARC project. It was also released under the GNU General public license v2. OpenSPARC T2 has 8 cores, each of which has two integer ALUs and one FPU and can execute 8 threads concurrently, for a total of 64 threads.

== See also ==
- Amber (processor core) – ARM-Compatible OpenCores Project
- J Core – SuperH-Compatible OpenCores Project
- LEON
- S1 Core (a derived single-core implementation)
- FeiTeng, an implementation designed and produced in China for supercomputing applications
- Field-programmable gate array
- RISC-V
