= Sun Neptune =

Neptune, also known as Sun Multithreaded 10 GbE, is a dual 10 Gbit/s, multithreaded, PCIe x8-based network interface controller for 10 Gigabit Ethernet. It was developed and originally produced by Sun Microsystems, and later licensed to Marvell Technology Group in 2007.

A Neptune-based NIC is integrated in UltraSPARC T2 CPUs (Network Interface Unit, or NIU).

== NIC Features ==
Stand-alone vs on-chip (NIU) Neptune Features
Features	NIU	PCI-E NIC
# 10GbE ports	2	2
# transmit DMA channels/port	8	12
# receive DMA channels/port	8	8
Integrated on-chip?	UltraSPARC T2	No
Bus interface?	No	8 lane PCI Express
Bus bandwidth limit?	No	16 Gbit/s each direction
Transmit packet classification	Software	Software
Receive packet classification	Hardware	Hardware
