= SPARC T5 =

Microprocessor by Oracle, and the servers containing them

- Oracle SPARC T5

General information
- Launched: 2013
- Discontinued: 2017

Performance
- Max. CPU clock rate: 3.6 GHz

Physical specifications
- Cores: 16

Cache
- L1 cache: 16×(16+16) KB
- L2 cache: 16×128 KB
- L3 cache: 8 MB

Architecture and classification
- Technology node: 28 nm
- Instruction set: SPARC V9

Products, models, variants
- Core name: S3

History
- Predecessor: SPARC T4
- Successor: SPARC M7

SPARC T5 is the fifth generation multicore microprocessor of Oracle's SPARC T series family. It was first presented at Hot Chips 24 in August 2012, and was officially introduced with the Oracle SPARC T5 servers in March 2013. The processor is designed to offer high multithreaded performance (16 cores per chip, with 8 threads per core), as well as high single threaded performance from the same chip.

The processor uses the same SPARC S3 core design as its predecessor, the SPARC T4 processor, but is implemented in a 28 nm process and runs at 3.6 GHz. The S3 core is a dual-issue core that uses dynamic threading and out-of-order execution, incorporates one floating point unit, one dedicated cryptographic unit per core.

The 64-bit SPARC Version 9 based processor has 16 cores supporting up to 128 threads per processor, and scales up to 1,024 threads in an 8 socket system. Other changes include the support of PCIe version 3.0 and a new cache coherence protocol.

== SPARC T4, T5 and T7/M7 compared ==
This chart shows some differences between the T5 and T4 processor chips.

Processor	SPARC T4	SPARC T5	T7 / M7
Max chips per system	4	8	16
Cores per chip	8	16	32
Max threads per chip	64	128	256
Frequency	2.85–3.0 GHz	3.6 GHz	4.13 GHz
Shared Level 3 cache	4 MB	8 MB	64 MB
MCUs per chip	2	4	4
Transfer rate per MCU	6.4 Gbit/s	12.8 Gbit/s	
Process Technology	40 nm	28 nm	20 nm
Die size	403 mm^{2}	478 mm^{2}	
PCIe Version	2.0	3.0	3.0

The SPARC T5 also introduces a new power management feature that consists of hardware support in the processor, and the software that allows system administrator to use the feature. Users select the policy how the system responds to over-temperature and over-current events. The dynamic voltage and frequency scaling (aka DVFS) policy can be set to maintain peak frequency, or to trade off between performance and power consumption.

== SPARC T5 in systems ==
The SPARC T5 processor is used in Oracle's entry and mid-size SPARC T5-2, T5-4, and T5-8 servers. All servers use the same processor frequency, number of cores per chip and cache configuration.

The T5 processor includes a crossbar network that connects the 16 cores with the L2 caches to the shared L3 cache. Multiprocessor cache coherence is maintained using a directory-based protocol. The design scales up to eight sockets without additional silicon (glueless). The snooping based protocol used in SPARC T4 systems was replaced in order to reduce memory latency and reduce coherency bandwidth consumption.
