= SPARC =

RISC instruction set architecture

- Designer: Sun Microsystems (acquired by Oracle Corporation)
- Bits: 64-bit (32 → 64)
- Introduced: 1986; 40 years ago (production); 1987; 39 years ago (shipments)
- Version: V9 (1993) / OSA2017
- Design: RISC
- Type: Load–store
- Encoding: Fixed
- Branching: Condition code
- Endianness: Bi (Big → Bi)
- Page size: 8 KB (4 KB → 8 KB)
- Extensions: VIS 1.0, 2.0, 3.0, 4.0
- Open: Yes, and royalty free

Registers
- General-purpose: 31 (G0 = 0; non-global registers use register windows)
- Floating-point: 32 (usable as 32 single-precision, 32 double-precision, or 16 quad-precision)

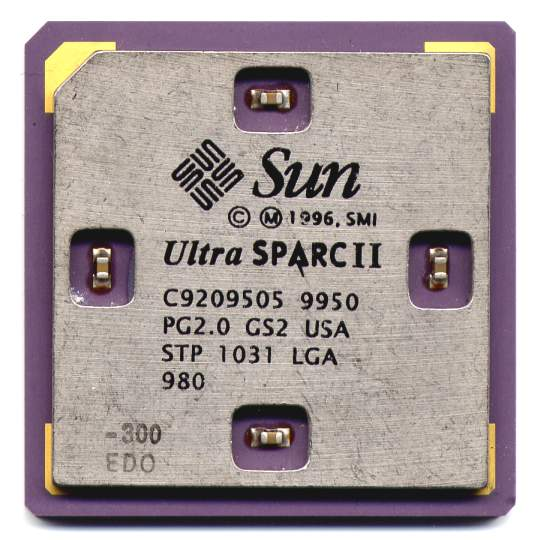
A Sun UltraSPARC II microprocessor (1997)

SPARC (Scalable Processor ARChitecture) is a reduced instruction set computer (RISC) instruction set architecture originally developed by Sun Microsystems. Its design was strongly influenced by the experimental Berkeley RISC system developed in the early 1980s. First developed in 1986 and released in 1987, SPARC was one of the most successful early commercial RISC systems, and its success led to the introduction of similar RISC designs from many vendors through the 1980s and 1990s. After acquiring Sun, Oracle Corporation ended its SPARC development in 2017, though Fujitsu continued shipping SPARC-based servers into the 2020s.

== Description ==
By the mid-1980s the computer industry's consensus was that RISC had a much better price/performance ratio than traditional CISC architecture. Workstation vendor Sun Microsystems decided to move to RISC as fast as possible from the Motorola 68000 series of processors.

The first implementation of the original 32-bit architecture (SPARC V7) was used in Sun's Sun-4 computer workstation and server systems, replacing their earlier Sun-3 systems based on the Motorola 68000 series. SPARC V8 added a number of improvements that were part of the SuperSPARC series of processors released in 1992. SPARC V9, released in 1993, introduced a 64-bit architecture and was first released in Sun's UltraSPARC processors in 1995. Later, SPARC processors were used in symmetric multiprocessing (SMP) and non-uniform memory access (CC-NUMA) servers produced by Sun, Solbourne, and Fujitsu, among others.

The design was turned over to the SPARC International trade group in 1989, and since then its architecture has been developed by its members. SPARC International is also responsible for licensing and promoting the SPARC architecture, managing SPARC trademarks (including SPARC, which it owns), and providing conformance testing. SPARC International was intended to grow the SPARC architecture to create a larger ecosystem; SPARC has been licensed to several manufacturers, including Atmel, Bipolar Integrated Technology, Cypress Semiconductor, Fujitsu, Matsushita and Texas Instruments. Due to SPARC International, SPARC is fully open, non-proprietary and royalty-free.

As of 2026, the latest commercial high-end SPARC processors remain Fujitsu's SPARC64 XII (introduced in September 2017 for its SPARC M12 server) and Oracle's SPARC M8 (introduced in September 2017 for its high-end servers); no new high-end SPARC processor has been released since.

On September 1, 2017, after a round of layoffs that started in Oracle Labs in November 2016, Oracle terminated SPARC design after completing the M8. Much of the processor core development group in Austin, Texas, was dismissed, as were the teams in Santa Clara, California, and Burlington, Massachusetts.

Fujitsu has also wound down its SPARC production, having shifted to designing its own ARM-based CPUs. Following an enhanced version of the SPARC M12 server shipped in 2020–2022 (originally planned for 2021), Fujitsu has scheduled end-of-sale of its SPARC-based UNIX servers for 2029 and of its mainframe line a year later, with end-of-support in 2034 "to promote customer modernization".

== Features ==
The SPARC architecture was heavily influenced by the earlier RISC designs, including the Berkeley RISC I and II from the University of California, Berkeley and the IBM 801. These original RISC designs were minimalist, including as few features or op-codes as possible and aiming to execute instructions at a rate of almost one instruction per clock cycle. This made them similar to the MIPS architecture in many ways, including the lack of instructions such as multiply or divide. Another feature of SPARC influenced by this early RISC movement is the branch delay slot.

The SPARC processor usually contains as many as 160 general-purpose registers. According to the "Oracle SPARC Architecture 2015" specification an "implementation may contain from 72 to 640 general-purpose 64-bit" registers. At any point, only 32 of them are immediately visible to software — 8 are a set of global registers (one of which, g0, is hard-wired to zero, so only seven of them are usable as registers) and the other 24 are from the stack of registers. These 24 registers form what is called a register window, and at function call/return, this window is moved up and down the register stack. Each window has eight local registers and shares eight registers with each of the adjacent windows. The shared registers are used for passing function parameters and returning values, and the local registers are used for retaining local values across function calls.

The "scalable" in SPARC comes from the fact that the SPARC specification allows implementations to scale from embedded processors up through large server processors, all sharing the same core (non-privileged) instruction set. One of the architectural parameters that can scale is the number of implemented register windows; the specification allows from three to 32 windows to be implemented, so the implementation can choose to implement all 32 to provide maximum call stack efficiency, or to implement only three to reduce cost and complexity of the design, or to implement some number between them. Other architectures that include similar register file features include Intel i960, IA-64, and AMD 29000.

The architecture has gone through several revisions. It gained hardware multiply and divide functionality in version 8. 64-bit (addressing and data) were added to the version 9 SPARC specification published in 1994.

In SPARC version 8, the floating-point register file has 16 double-precision registers. Each of them can be used as two single-precision registers, providing a total of 32 single-precision registers. An odd–even number pair of double-precision registers can be used as a quad-precision register, thus allowing 8 quad-precision registers. SPARC Version 9 added 16 more double-precision registers (which can also be accessed as 8 quad-precision registers), but these additional registers can not be accessed as single-precision registers. No SPARC CPU implements quad-precision operations in hardware as of 2026.

Tagged add and subtract instructions perform adds and subtracts on values checking that the bottom two bits of both operands are 0 and reporting overflow if they are not. This can be useful in the implementation of the run time for ML, Lisp, and similar languages that might use a tagged integer format.

The endianness of the 32-bit SPARC V8 architecture is purely big-endian. The 64-bit SPARC V9 architecture uses big-endian instructions, but can access data in either big-endian or little-endian byte order, chosen either at the application instruction (load–store) level or at the memory page level (via an MMU setting). The latter is often used for accessing data from inherently little-endian devices, such as those on PCI buses.

== History ==
There have been three major revisions of the architecture.

The first published version was the 32-bit SPARC version 7 (V7) in 1986. SPARC version 8 (V8), an enhanced SPARC architecture definition, was released in 1990 and served as the basis for the SuperSPARC series of processors shipped from 1992. The main differences between V7 and V8 were the addition of integer multiply and divide instructions, and an upgrade from 80-bit "extended-precision" floating-point arithmetic to 128-bit "quad-precision" arithmetic. SPARC V8 served as the basis for IEEE Standard 1754-1994, an IEEE standard for a 32-bit microprocessor architecture.

SPARC version 9 (V9), the 64-bit SPARC architecture, was released by SPARC International in 1993. It was developed by the SPARC Architecture Committee consisting of Amdahl Corporation, Fujitsu, ICL, LSI Logic, Matsushita, Philips, Ross Technology, Sun Microsystems, and Texas Instruments. Newer specifications always remain compliant with the full SPARC V9 Level 1 specification.

In 2002, the SPARC Joint Programming Specification 1 (JPS1) was released by Fujitsu and Sun, describing processor functions which were identically implemented in the CPUs of both companies ("Commonality"). The first CPUs conforming to JPS1 were the UltraSPARC III by Sun and the SPARC64 V by Fujitsu. Functionalities which are not covered by JPS1 are documented for each processor in "Implementation Supplements".

At the end of 2003, Joint Programming Specification 2 (JPS2) was released to support multicore CPUs. The first CPUs conforming to JPS2 were the UltraSPARC IV by Sun and the SPARC64 VI by Fujitsu.

In early 2006, Sun released an extended architecture specification, UltraSPARC Architecture 2005 (UA2005). This includes not only the non-privileged and most of the privileged portions of SPARC V9, but also all the architectural extensions developed through the processor generations of UltraSPARC III, IV, and IV+, as well as Chip Multithreading Technology (CMT) extensions starting with the UltraSPARC T1 implementation:

- the VIS 1 and VIS 2 instruction set extensions and the associated GSR register
- multiple levels of global registers, controlled by the GL register
- Sun's 64-bit MMU architecture
- privileged instructions ALLCLEAN, OTHERW, NORMALW, and INVALW
- access to the VER register is now hyperprivileged
- the SIR instruction is now hyperprivileged

In 2007, Sun released an updated specification, UltraSPARC Architecture 2007 (UA2007), to which the UltraSPARC T2 implementation complied.

In December 2007, Sun also made the UltraSPARC T2 processor's RTL available via the OpenSPARC project. It was also released under the GNU General public license v2. OpenSPARC T2 is 8 cores, 16 pipelines with 64 threads.

In August 2012, Oracle Corporation made available a new specification, Oracle SPARC Architecture 2011 (OSA2011), which besides the overall update of the reference, adds the VIS 3 instruction set extensions and hyperprivileged mode to the 2007 specification.

In October 2015, Oracle released SPARC M7, the first processor based on the new Oracle SPARC Architecture 2015 (OSA2015) specification. This revision includes VIS 4 instruction set extensions and hardware-assisted encryption and silicon secured memory (SSM).

In September 2017, Oracle released SPARC M8, the first processor based on the new Oracle SPARC Architecture 2017 (OSA2017) specification.

SPARC architecture has provided continuous application binary compatibility from the first SPARC V7 implementation in 1987 through the Sun UltraSPARC Architecture implementations.

Among various implementations of SPARC, Sun's SuperSPARC and UltraSPARC-I were very popular, and were used as reference systems for SPEC CPU95 and CPU2000 benchmarks. The 296 MHz UltraSPARC-II is the reference system for the SPEC CPU2006 benchmark.

== Architecture ==
SPARC is a load–store architecture (also known as a register–register architecture); except for the load/store instructions used to access memory, all instructions operate on the registers, in accordance with the RISC design principles.

A SPARC processor includes an integer unit (IU) that performs integer load, store, and arithmetic operations. It may include a floating-point unit (FPU) that performs floating-point operations and, for SPARC V8, may include a coprocessor (CP) that performs coprocessor-specific operations; the architecture does not specify what functions a coprocessor would perform, other than load and store operations.

=== Registers ===
The SPARC architecture has an overlapping register window scheme. At any instant, 32 general-purpose registers are visible. A Current Window Pointer (CWP) variable in the hardware points to the current set. The total size of the register file is not part of the architecture, allowing more registers to be added as the technology improves, up to a maximum of 32 windows in SPARC V7 and V8 as CWP is 5 bits and is part of the PSR register.

In SPARC V7 and V8 CWP will usually be decremented by the SAVE instruction (used by the SAVE instruction during the procedure call to open a new stack frame and switch the register window), or incremented by the RESTORE instruction (switching back to the call before returning from the procedure). Trap events (interrupts, exceptions or TRAP instructions) and RETT instructions (returning from traps) also change the CWP. For SPARC V9, CWP register is decremented during a RESTORE instruction, and incremented during a SAVE instruction. This is the opposite of PSR.CWP's behavior in SPARC V8. This change has no effect on nonprivileged instructions.

Window Addressing
Register group	Mnemonic	Register address	Availability
global	G0...G7	R[0]...R[7]	always the same ones, G0 being zero always
out	O0...O7	R[8]...R[15]	to be handed over to, and returned from, the called subroutine, as its "in"
local	L0...L7	R[16]...R[23]	truly local to the current subroutine
in	I0...I7	R[24]...R[31]	handed over from the caller, and returned to the caller, as its "out"

SPARC registers are shown in the figure above.

There is also a non-windowed Y register, used by the multiply-step, integer multiply, and integer divide instructions.

A SPARC V8 processor with an FPU includes 32 32-bit floating-point registers, each of which can hold one single-precision IEEE 754 floating-point number. An even–odd pair of floating-point registers can hold one double-precision IEEE 754 floating-point number, and a quad-aligned group of four floating-point registers can hold one quad-precision IEEE 754 floating-point number.

A SPARC V9 processor with an FPU includes:

- 32 32-bit floating-point registers, each of which can hold one single-precision IEEE 754 floating-point number;
- 32 64-bit floating-point registers, each of which can hold one double-precision IEEE 754 floating-point number;
- 16 128-bit floating-point registers, each of which can hold one quad-precision IEEE 754 floating-point number.

The registers are organized as a set of 64 32-bit registers, with the first 32 being used as the 32-bit floating-point registers, even–odd pairs of all 64 registers being used as the 64-bit floating-point registers, and quad-aligned groups of four floating-point registers being used as the 128-bit floating-point registers.

Floating-point registers are not windowed; they are all global registers.

=== Instruction formats ===
All SPARC instructions occupy a full 32-bit word and start on a word boundary. Four formats are used, distinguished by the first two bits. All arithmetic and logical instructions have 2 source operands and 1 destination operand. RD is the "destination register", where the output of the operation is deposited. The majority of SPARC instructions have at least this register, so it is placed near the "front" of the instruction format. RS1 and RS2 are the "source registers", which may or may not be present, or replaced by a constant.

SPARC instruction formats
Type	Bit																															
Type	31	30	29	28	27	26	25	24	23	22	21	20	19	18	17	16	15	14	13	12	11	10	9	8	7	6	5	4	3	2	1	0
SETHI format	00		RD					100			Immediate constant 22 bits																					
I Branch format	00		A	icc				010			Displacement constant 22 bits																					
F Branch format	00		A	fcc				110			Displacement constant 22 bits																					
C Branch format	00		A	ccc				111			Displacement constant 22 bits																					
CALL disp	01		PC-relative displacement																													
Arithmetic register	10		RD					opcode						RS1					0	0								RS2				
Arithmetic immediate	10		RD					opcode						RS1					1	Immediate constant 13 bits												
FPU operation	10		FD					110100/110101						FS1					opf									FS2				
CP operation	10		RD					110110/110111						RS1					opc									RS2				
JMPL register	10		RD					111000						RS1					0	0								RS2				
JMPL immediate	10		RD					111000						RS1					1	Immediate constant 13 bits												
LD/ST register	11		RD					opcode						RS1					0	0								RS2				
LD/ST immediate	11		RD					opcode						RS1					1	Immediate constant 13 bits												

=== Instructions ===
==== Loads and stores ====
Load and store instructions have a three-operand format, in that they have two operands representing values for the address and one operand for the register to read or write to. The address is created by adding the two address operands to produce an address. The second address operand may be a constant or a register. Loads take the value at the address and place it in the register specified by the third operand, whereas stores take the value in the register specified by the first operand and place it at the address. To make this more obvious, the assembler language indicates address operands using square brackets with a plus sign separating the operands, instead of using a comma-separated list. Examples:

ld [%L1+%L2],%L3  !load the 32-bit value at address %L1+%L2 and put the value into %L3
ld [%L1+8],%L2    !load the value at %L1+8 into %L2
ld [%L1],%L2      !as above, but no offset, which is the same as +%G0
st %L1,[%I2]      !store the value in %L1 into the location stored in %I2
st %G0,[%I1+8]    !clear the memory at %I1+8

Due to the widespread use of non-32-bit data, such as 16-bit or 8-bit integral data or 8-bit bytes in strings, there are instructions that load and store 16-bit half-words and 8-bit bytes, as well as instructions that load 32-bit words. During a load, those instructions will read only the byte or half-word at the indicated location and then either fill the rest of the target register with zeros (unsigned load) or with the value of the uppermost bit of the byte or half-word (signed load). During a store, those instructions discard the upper bits in the register and store only the lower bits. There are also instructions for loading double-precision values used for floating-point arithmetic, reading or writing eight bytes from the indicated register and the "next" one, so if the destination of a load is L1, L1 and L2 will be set. The complete list of load and store instructions for the general-purpose registers in 32-bit SPARC is LD, ST, LDUB (unsigned byte), LDSB (signed byte), LDUH (unsigned half-word), LDSH (signed half-word), LDD (load double), STB (store byte), STH (store half-word), STD (store double).

In SPARC V9, registers are 64-bit, and the LD instruction, renamed LDUW, clears the upper 32 bits in the register and loads the 32-bit value into the lower 32 bits, and the ST instruction, renamed STW, discards the upper 32 bits of the register and stores only the lower 32 bits. The new LDSW instruction sets the upper bits in the register to the value of the uppermost bit of the word and loads the 32-bit value into the lower bits. The new LDX instruction loads a 64-bit value into the register, and the STX instruction stores all 64 bits of the register.

The LDF, LDDF, and LDQF instructions load a single-precision, double-precision, or quad-precision value from memory into a floating-point register; the STF, STDF, and STQF instructions store a single-precision, double-precision, or quad-precision floating-point register into memory.

The memory barrier instruction, MEMBAR, serves two interrelated purposes: it articulates order constraints among memory references and facilitates explicit control over the completion of memory references. For example, all effects of the stores that appear prior to the MEMBAR instruction must be made visible to all processors before any loads following the MEMBAR can be executed.

==== ALU operations ====
Arithmetic and logical instructions also use a three-operand format, with the first two being the operands and the last being the location to store the result. The middle operand can be a register or a 13-bit signed integer constant; the other operands are registers. Any of the register operands may point to G0; pointing the result to G0 discards the results, which can be used for tests. Examples include:

add %L1,%L2,%L3   !add the values in %L1 and %L2 and put the result in %L3
add %L1,1,%L1     !increment %L1
add %G0,%G0,%L4   !clear any value in %L4

The list of mathematical instructions is ADD, SUB, AND, OR, XOR, and negated versions ANDN, ORN, and XNOR. One quirk of the SPARC design is that most arithmetic instructions come in pairs, with one version setting the NZVC condition code bits in the status register, and the other not setting them, with the default being not to set the codes. This is so that the compiler has a way to move instructions around when trying to fill delay slots. If one wants the condition codes to be set, this is indicated by adding cc to the instruction:

subcc %L1,10,%G0  !compare %L1 to 10 and ignore the result, but set the flags

add and sub also have another modifier, X, which indicates whether the operation should set the carry bit:

addx %L1,100,%L1  !add 100 to the value in %L1 and track carry

SPARC V7 does not have multiplication or division instructions, but it does have MULSCC, which does one step of a multiplication testing one bit and conditionally adding the multiplicand to the product. This was because MULSCC can complete over one clock cycle in keeping with the RISC philosophy. SPARC V8 added UMUL (unsigned multiply), SMUL (signed multiply), UDIV (unsigned divide), and SDIV (signed divide) instructions, with both versions that do not update the condition codes and versions that do. MULSCC and the multiply instructions use the Y register to hold the upper 32 bits of the product; the divide instructions use it to hold the upper 32 bits of the dividend. The RDY instruction reads the value of the Y register into a general-purpose register; the WRY instruction writes the value of a general-purpose register to the Y register. SPARC V9 added MULX, which multiplies two 64-bit values and produces a 64-bit result, SDIVX, which divides a 64-bit signed dividend by a 64-bit signed divisor and produces a 64-bit signed quotient, and UDIVX, which divides a 64-bit unsigned dividend by a 64-bit unsigned divisor and produces a 64-bit signed quotient; none of those instructions use the Y register.

==== Branching ====
Conditional branches test condition codes in a status register, as seen in many instruction sets such the IBM System/360 architecture and successors and the x86 architecture. This means that a test and branch is normally performed with two instructions; the first is an ALU instruction that sets the condition codes, followed by a branch instruction that examines one of those flags. The SPARC does not have specialized test instructions; tests are performed using normal ALU instructions with the destination set to %G0. For instance, to test if a register holds the value 10 and then branch to code that handles it, one would:

subcc %L1,10,%G0 !subtract 10 from %L1, setting the zero flag if %L1 is 10
be WASEQUAL      !if the zero flag is set, branch to the address marked WASEQUAL

In a conditional branch instruction, the icc or fcc field specifies the condition being tested. The 22-bit displacement field is the address, relative to the current PC, of the target, in words, so that conditional branches can go forward or backward up to 8 megabytes. The ANNUL (A) bit is used to get rid of some delay slots. If it is 0 in a conditional branch, the delay slot is executed as usual. If it is 1, the delay slot is only executed if the branch is taken. If it is not taken, the instruction following the conditional branch is skipped.

There are a wide variety of conditional branches: BA (branch always, essentially a jmp), BN (branch never), BE (equals), BNE (not equals), BL (less than), BLE (less or equal), BLEU (less or equal, unsigned), BG (greater), BGE (greater or equal), BGU (greater unsigned), BPOS (positive), BNEG (negative), BCC (carry clear), BCS (carry set), BVC (overflow clear), BVS (overflow set).

The FPU and CP have sets of condition codes separate from the integer condition codes and from each other; two additional sets of branch instructions were defined to test those condition codes. Adding an F to the front of the branch instruction in the list above performs the test against the FPU's condition codes, while, in SPARC V8, adding a C tests the flags in the otherwise undefined CP.

The CALL (jump to subroutine) instruction uses a 30-bit program counter-relative word offset. As the target address is specifying the start of a word, not a byte, 30-bits is all that is needed to reach any address in the 4 gigabyte address space. The CALL instruction deposits the return address in register R15, also known as output register O7.

The JMPL (jump and link) instruction is a three-operand instruction, with two operands representing values for the target address and one operand for a register in which to deposit the return address. The address is created by adding the two address operands to produce a 32-bit address. The second address operand may be a constant or a register.

==== Large constants ====
As the instruction opcode takes up some bits of the 32-bit instruction word, there is no way to load a 32-bit constant using a single instruction. This is significant because addresses are manipulated through registers and they are 32-bits. To ease this, the special-purpose SETHI instruction copies its 22-bit immediate operand into the high-order 22 bits of any specified register, and sets each of the low-order 10 bits to 0. In general use, SETHI is followed by an or instruction with only the lower 10 bits of the value set. To ease this, the assembler includes the %hi(X) and %lo(X) macros. For example:

sethi %hi(<value>),%L1       !sets the upper 22 bits of L1
or    %L1,%lo(<value>),%L1   !sets the lower 10 bits of L1 by ORing

The hi and lo macros are performed at assembly time, not runtime, so it has no performance hit yet makes it clearer that L1 is set to a single value, not two unrelated ones. To make this even easier, the assembler also includes a "synthetic instruction", set, that performs these two operations in a single line:

set   <value>,%L1

This outputs a single sethi <value>,%L1 (for values with the lowest 13 bits unset) or a single or %G0,<value>,%L1 (for values between -4096 and 4095 inclusive). Otherwise, it will output the two instructions above.

=== Synthetic instructions ===
As noted earlier, the SPARC assembler uses "synthetic instructions" to ease common coding tasks. Additional examples include (among others):

SPARC synthetic instructions
mnemonic	actual output	purpose
clr %reg	or %g0,%g0,%reg	set a register to zero
clr [address]	st %g0,[address]	set a memory address to zero
clrh [address]	sth %g0,[address]	set the half-word at memory address to zero
clrb [address]	stb %g0,[address]	set the byte at memory address to zero
cmp %reg1,%reg2	subcc %reg1,%reg2,%g0	compare two registers, set codes, discard results
cmp %reg,const	subcc %reg,const,%g0	compare register with constant
mov %reg1,%reg2	or %g0,%reg1,%reg2	copy value from one register to another
mov const,%reg	or %g0,const,%reg	copy constant value into a register
inc %reg	add %reg,1,%reg	increment a register
inccc %reg	addcc %reg,1,%reg	increment a register, set conditions
dec %reg	sub %reg,1,%reg	decrement a register
deccc %reg	subcc %reg,1,%reg	decrement a register, set conditions
not %reg	xnor %reg,%g0,%reg	flip the bits in a register
neg %reg	sub %g0,%reg,%reg	two's complement a register
tst %reg	orcc %g0,%reg,%g0	test whether the value in a register is > 0, 0, or < 0

nop is not a synthetic instruction, but a "special case" of the sethi instruction, and is encoded as sethi 0,%g0.

== SPARC architecture licensees ==
Intel was the 80386's only producer, which made it very expensive and caused the industry to be wary of sole sourced CPUs. When Sun announced SPARC in 1987, the company stated that it would be available from multiple sources. Fujitsu was the first SPARC vendor, and Cypress Semiconductor was the second licensee; as of February 1989 their SPARC CPUs were available, as was Texas Instruments's FPU. The following organizations have licensed the SPARC architecture:

- Afara Websystems
- Bipolar Integrated Technology (BIT)
- Cypress Semiconductor
- European Space Research and Technology Center (ESTEC)
- Fujitsu (and its Fujitsu Microelectronics subsidiary)
- Gaisler Research
- HAL Computer Systems
- Hyundai
- LSI Logic
- Matra Harris Semiconductors (MHS)
- Matsushita Electrical Industrial Co.
- Meiko Scientific
- Metaflow Technologies
- Philips Electronics
- Prisma
- Ross Technology
- Solbourne Computer
- Systems & Processes Engineering Corporation (SPEC)
- TEMIC
- Texas Instruments
- Weitek

== Implementations ==
Name (codename)	Model	Frequency (MHz)	Arch. version	Year	Total threads (Note: Threads per core × number of cores)	Process (nm)	Transistors (millions)	Die size (mm^{2})	IO pins	Power (W)	Voltage (V)	L1 Dcache (KB)	L1 Icache (KB)	L2 cache (KB)	L3 cache (KB)
SPARC MB86900	Fujitsu	14.28–33	V7	1986	1×1=1	1300	0.11	—N/a	256	—N/a	—N/a	0–128 (unified)		none	none
SPARC	Various (Note: Various SPARC V7 implementations were produced by Fujitsu, LSI Logic, Weitek, Texas Instruments, Cypress and Temic. A SPARC V7 processor generally consisted of several discrete chips, usually comprising an integer unit (IU), a floating-point unit (FPU), a memory management unit (MMU) and cache memory. Conversely, the Atmel (now Microchip Technology) TSC695 is a single-chip SPARC V7 implementation.)	14.28–40	V7	1989–1992	1×1=1	800–1300	~0.1–1.8	—N/a	160–256	—N/a	—N/a	0–128 (unified)		none	none
MN10501 (KAP)	Solbourne Computer, Matsushita	33–36	V8	1990–1991	1×1=1	—N/a	1.0	—N/a	—N/a	—N/a	—N/a	8	8	0–256	none
microSPARC I (Tsunami)	TI TMS390S10	40–50	V8	1992	1×1=1	800	0.8	225?	288	2.5	5	2	4	none	none
SuperSPARC I (Viking)	TI TMX390Z50 / Sun STP1020	33–60	V8	1992	1×1=1	800	3.1	—N/a	293	14.3	5	16	20	0–2048	none
SPARClite	Fujitsu MB8683x	66–108	V8E	1992	1×1=1	—N/a	—N/a	—N/a	144, 176	—N/a	2.5/3.3–5.0 V, 2.5–3.3 V	1, 2, 8, 16	1, 2, 8, 16	none	none
hyperSPARC (Colorado 1)	Ross RT620A	40–90	V8	1993	1×1=1	500	1.5	—N/a	—N/a	—N/a	5?	0	8	128–256	none
microSPARC II (Swift)	Fujitsu MB86904 / Sun STP1012	60–125	V8	1994	1×1=1	500	2.3	233	321	5	3.3	8	16	none	none
hyperSPARC (Colorado 2)	Ross RT620B	90–125	V8	1994	1×1=1	400	1.5	—N/a	—N/a	—N/a	3.3	0	8	128–256	none
SuperSPARC II (Voyager)	Sun STP1021	75–90	V8	1994	1×1=1	800	3.1	299	—N/a	16	—N/a	16	20	1024–2048	none
hyperSPARC (Colorado 3)	Ross RT620C	125–166	V8	1995	1×1=1	350	1.5	—N/a	—N/a	—N/a	3.3	0	8	512–1024	none
TurboSPARC	Fujitsu MB86907	160–180	V8	1996	1×1=1	350	3.0	132	416	7	3.5	16	16	512	none
UltraSPARC (Spitfire)	Sun STP1030	143–167	V9	1995	1×1=1	470	3.8	315	521	30 (Note: @167 MHz)	3.3	16	16	512–1024	none
UltraSPARC (Hornet)	Sun STP1030	200	V9	1995	1×1=1	420	5.2	265	521	—N/a	3.3	16	16	512–1024	none
hyperSPARC (Colorado 4)	Ross RT620D	180–200	V8	1996	1×1=1	350	1.7	—N/a	—N/a	—N/a	3.3	16	16	512	none
SPARC64	Fujitsu (HAL)	101–118	V9	1995	1×1=1	400	—N/a	Multichip	286	50	3.8	128	128	—N/a	—N/a
SPARC64 II	Fujitsu (HAL)	141–161	V9	1996	1×1=1	350	—N/a	Multichip	286	64	3.3	128	128	—N/a	—N/a
SPARC64 III	Fujitsu (HAL) MBCS70301	250–330	V9	1998	1×1=1	240	17.6	240	—N/a	—N/a	2.5	64	64	8192	—N/a
UltraSPARC IIs (Blackbird)	Sun STP1031	250–400	V9	1997	1×1=1	350	5.4	149	521	25 (Note: @250 MHz)	2.5	16	16	1024 or 4096	none
UltraSPARC IIs (Sapphire-Black)	Sun STP1032 / STP1034	360–480	V9	1999	1×1=1	250	5.4	126	521	21 (Note: @400 MHz)	1.9	16	16	1024–8192	none
UltraSPARC IIi (Sabre)	Sun SME1040	270–360	V9	1997	1×1=1	350	5.4	156	587	21	1.9	16	16	256–2048	none
UltraSPARC IIi (Sapphire-Red)	Sun SME1430	333–480	V9	1998	1×1=1	250	5.4	—N/a	587	21 (Note: @440 MHz)	1.9	16	16	2048	none
UltraSPARC IIe (Hummingbird)	Sun SME1701	400–500	V9	1999	1×1=1	180 Al	—N/a	—N/a	370	13 (Note: max. @500 MHz)	1.5–1.7	16	16	256	none
UltraSPARC IIi (IIe+) (Phantom)	Sun SME1532	550–650	V9	2000	1×1=1	180 Cu	—N/a	—N/a	370	17.6	1.7	16	16	512	none
SPARC64 GP	Fujitsu SFCB81147	400–563	V9	2000	1×1=1	180	30.2	217	—N/a	—N/a	1.8	128	128	8192	—N/a
SPARC64 GP	--	600–810	V9	—N/a	1×1=1	150	30.2	—N/a	—N/a	—N/a	1.5	128	128	8192	—N/a
SPARC64 IV	Fujitsu MBCS80523	450–810	V9	2000	1×1=1	130	—N/a	—N/a	—N/a	—N/a	—N/a	128	128	2048	—N/a
UltraSPARC III (Cheetah)	Sun SME1050	600	JPS1	2001	1×1=1	180 Al	29	330	1368	53	1.6	64	32	8192	none
UltraSPARC III (Cheetah)	Sun SME1052	750–900	JPS1	2001	1×1=1	130 Al	29	—N/a	1368	—N/a	1.6	64	32	8192	none
UltraSPARC III Cu (Cheetah+)	Sun SME1056	900–1200	JPS1	2001	1×1=1	130 Cu	29	232	1368	50 (Note: @1200 MHz)	1.6	64	32	8192	none
UltraSPARC IIIi (Jalapeño)	Sun SME1603	1064–1593	JPS1	2003	1×1=1	130	87.5	206	959	52	1.3	64	32	1024	none
SPARC64 V (Zeus)	Fujitsu	1100–1350	JPS1	2003	1×1=1	130	190	289	269	40	1.2	128	128	2048	—N/a
SPARC64 V+ (Olympus-B)	Fujitsu	1650–2160	JPS1	2004	1×1=1	90	400	297	279	65	1	128	128	4096	—N/a
UltraSPARC IV (Jaguar)	Sun SME1167	1050–1350	JPS2	2004	1×2=2	130	66	356	1368	108	1.35	64	32	16384	none
UltraSPARC IV+ (Panther)	Sun SME1167A	1500–2100	JPS2	2005	1×2=2	90	295	336	1368	90	1.1	64	64	2048	32768
UltraSPARC T1 (Niagara)	Sun SME1905	1000–1400	UA2005	2005	4×8=32	90	300	340	1933	72	1.3	8	16	3072	none
SPARC64 VI (Olympus-C)	Fujitsu	2150–2400	JPS2	2007	2×2=4	90	540	422	—N/a	120–150	1.1	128×2	128×2	4096–6144	none
UltraSPARC T2 (Niagara 2)	Sun SME1908A	1000–1600	UA2007	2007	8×8=64	65	503	342	1831	95	1.1–1.5	8	16	4096	none
UltraSPARC T2 Plus (Victoria Falls)	Sun SME1910A	1200–1600	UA2007	2008	8×8=64	65	503	342	1831	—N/a	—N/a	8	16	4096	none
SPARC64 VII (Jupiter)	Fujitsu	2400–2880	JPS2	2008	2×4=8	65	600	445	—N/a	150	—N/a	64×4	64×4	6144	none
UltraSPARC "RK" (Rock)	Sun SME1832	2300	?	canceled	2×16=32	65	?	396	2326	?	?	32	32	2048	?
SPARC64 VIIIfx (Venus)	Fujitsu	2000	JPS1 / HPC-ACE	2009	1×8=8	45	760	513	1271	58	?	32×8	32×8	6144	none
LEON2FT	Atmel AT697F	100	V8	2009	1×1=1	180	—N/a	—N/a	196	1	1.8/3.3	16	32	—N/a	none
SPARC T3 (Rainbow Falls)	Oracle/Sun	1650	UA2007	2010	8×16=128	40	?	371	?	139	?	8	16	6144	none
Galaxy FT-1500	NUDT (China)	1800	UA2007	2013	8×16=128	40	?	?	?	65	?	16×16	16×16	512×16	4096
SPARC64 VII+ (Jupiter-E or M3)	Fujitsu	2667–3000	JPS2	2010	2×4=8	65	—N/a	—N/a	—N/a	160	—N/a	64×4	64×4	12288	none
LEON3FT	Cobham Gaisler GR712RC	100	V8E	2011	1×2=2	130	—N/a	—N/a	—N/a	1.5 (Note: excluding I/O buses)	1.8/3.3	4x4Kb	4x4Kb	none	none
R1000	MCST (Russia)	1000	?	2011	1×4=4	90	180	128	—N/a	15	1, 1.8, 2.5	32	16	2048	none
SPARC T4 (Yosemite Falls)	Oracle	2850–3000	OSA2011	2011	8×8=64	40	855	403	?	240	?	16×8	16×8	128×8	4096
SPARC64 IXfx	Fujitsu	1850	JPS1 / HPC-ACE	2012	1x16=16	40	1870	484	1442	110	?	32×16	32×16	12288	none
SPARC64 X (Athena)	Fujitsu	2800	OSA2011 / HPC-ACE	2012	2×16=32	28	2950	587.5	1500	270	?	64×16	64×16	24576	none
SPARC T5	Oracle	3600	OSA2011	2013	8×16=128	28	1500	478	?	?	?	16×16	16×16	128×16	8192
SPARC M5	Oracle	3600	OSA2011	2013	8×6=48	28	3900	511	?	?	?	16×6	16×6	128×6	49152
SPARC M6	Oracle	3600	OSA2011	2013	8×12=96	28	4270	643	?	?	?	16×12	16×12	128×12	49152
SPARC64 X+ (Athena+)	Fujitsu	3200–3700	OSA2011 / HPC-ACE	2014	2×16=32	28	2990	600	1500	392	?	64×16	64×16	24M	none
SPARC64 XIfx	Fujitsu	2200	OSA2011 / HPC-ACE2	2014	1×(32+2)=34	20	3750	?	1001	?	?	64×34	64×34	12M×2	none
SPARC M7	Oracle	4133	OSA2015	2015	8×32=256	20	>10,000	?	?	?	?	16×32	16×32	256×24	65536
SPARC S7	Oracle	4270	OSA2015	2016	8×8=64	20	?	?	?	?	?	16×8	16×8	256×2+256×4	16384
SPARC64 XII	Fujitsu	4250	OSA2011 / HPC-ACE	2017	8×12=96	20	5500	795	1860	?	?	64×12	64×12	512×12	32768
SPARC M8	Oracle	5000	OSA2017	2017	8×32=256	20	?	?	?	?	?	32×32	16×32	128×32+256×8	65536
LEON4	Cobham Gaisler GR740	250 (Note: nominal; specification from 100 to 424 MHz depending on attached RAM capabilities)	V8E	2017	1×4=4	32	—N/a	—N/a	—N/a	—N/a	1.2/2.5/3.3	4x4	4x4	2048	none
R2000 (1891BM01A8)	MCST (Russia)	2000	SPARC v9	2018	1×8=8	28	500	?	—N/a	36W	1.8	32 + 8x16	32 + 8x16	4096	none
LEON5	Cobham Gaisler	—N/a	V8E	2019	?	?	—N/a	—N/a	—N/a	—N/a	—N/a	?	?	16–8192	none
Name (codename)	Model	Frequency (MHz)	Arch. version	Year	Total threads	Process (nm)	Transistors (millions)	Die size (mm^{2})	IO pins	Power (W)	Voltage (V)	L1 Dcache (KB)	L1 Icache (KB)	L2 cache (KB)	L3 cache (KB)

== Operating system support ==
SPARC machines have generally used Sun's SunOS, Solaris, JavaOS, or OpenSolaris including derivatives illumos and OpenIndiana, but other operating systems have also been used, such as NeXTSTEP, RTEMS, FreeBSD, OpenBSD, NetBSD, and Linux.

In 1993, Intergraph announced a port of Windows NT to the SPARC architecture, but it was later cancelled.

In October 2015, Oracle announced a "Linux for SPARC reference platform".

== Open source implementations ==
Several fully open source implementations of the SPARC architecture exist:

- LEON, a 32-bit radiation-tolerant, SPARC V8 implementation, designed especially for space use. Source code is written in VHDL, and licensed under the GPL.
- OpenSPARC T1, released in 2006, a 64-bit, 32-thread implementation conforming to the UltraSPARC Architecture 2005 and to SPARC Version 9 (Level 1). Source code is written in Verilog, and licensed under many licenses. Most OpenSPARC T1 source code is licensed under the GPL. Source based on existent open source projects will continue to be licensed under their current licenses. Binary programs are licensed under a binary software license agreement.
- S1, a 64-bit Wishbone compliant CPU core based on the OpenSPARC T1 design. It is a single UltraSPARC V9 core capable of 4-way SMT. Like the T1, the source code is licensed under the GPL.
- OpenSPARC T2, released in 2008, a 64-bit, 64-thread implementation conforming to the UltraSPARC Architecture 2007 and to SPARC Version 9 (Level 1). Source code is written in Verilog, and licensed under many licenses. Most OpenSPARC T2 source code is licensed under the GPL. Source based on existing open source projects will continue to be licensed under their current licenses. Binary programs are licensed under a binary Software License Agreement.

A fully open source simulator for the SPARC architecture also exists:

- RAMP Gold, a 32-bit, 64-thread SPARC Version 8 implementation, designed for FPGA-based architecture simulation. RAMP Gold is written in ~36,000 lines of SystemVerilog, and licensed under the BSD licenses.

== Supercomputers ==
For HPC loads Fujitsu builds specialized SPARC64 fx processors with a new instruction extensions set, called HPC-ACE (High Performance Computing – Arithmetic Computational Extensions).

Fujitsu's K computer ranked No. 1 in the TOP500 June 2011 and November 2011 lists. It combines 88,128 SPARC64 VIIIfx CPUs, each with eight cores, for a total of 705,024 cores—almost twice as many as any other system in the TOP500 at that time. The K Computer was more powerful than the next five systems on the list combined, and had the highest performance-to-power ratio of any supercomputer system. It also ranked No. 6 in the Green500 June 2011 list, with a score of 824.56 MFLOPS/W. In the November 2012 release of TOP500, the K computer ranked No. 3, using by far the most power of the top three. It ranked No. 85 on the corresponding Green500 release. Newer HPC processors, IXfx and XIfx, were included in recent PRIMEHPC FX10 and FX100 supercomputers.

Tianhe-2 (TOP500 No. 1 as of November 2014) has a number of nodes with Galaxy FT-1500 OpenSPARC-based processors developed in China. However, those processors did not contribute to the LINPACK score.

== See also ==
- ERC32 — based on SPARC V7 specification
- Ross Technology, Inc. — a SPARC microprocessor developer during the 1980s and 1990s
- Sparcle — a modified SPARC with multiprocessing support used by the MIT Alewife project
- LEON — a space-rated SPARC V8 processor.
- R1000 — a Russian quad-core microprocessor based on SPARC V9 specification
- Galaxy FT-1500 — a Chinese 16-core OpenSPARC-based processor
