= List of x86 manufacturers =

x86-compatible processors have been designed, manufactured and sold by a number of companies, including:

== x86-processors for regular PCs ==
- Intel
- AMD
- Zhaoxin
- Hygon

In the past:

- Transmeta (discontinued its x86 line)
- Rise Technology (acquired by SiS, that sold its x86 (embedded) line to DM&P)
- IDT (Centaur Technology x86 division acquired by VIA)
- Cyrix (acquired by National Semiconductor)
- National Semiconductor (sold the x86 PC designs to VIA and later the x86 embedded designs to AMD)
- NexGen (acquired by AMD)
- Chips and Technologies (acquired by Intel)
- Texas Instruments (discontinued its own x86 line)
- IBM (discontinued its own x86 line and sold its manufacturing division to GlobalFoundries in 2015)
- UMC (discontinued its x86 line)
- NEC (discontinued its x86 line)
- VM Technology (discontinued its x86 line)
- VIA Technologies (co-owns Zhaoxin joint venture, whose processors are based and continue VIA's x86 line)

== x86-processors for embedded designs only ==
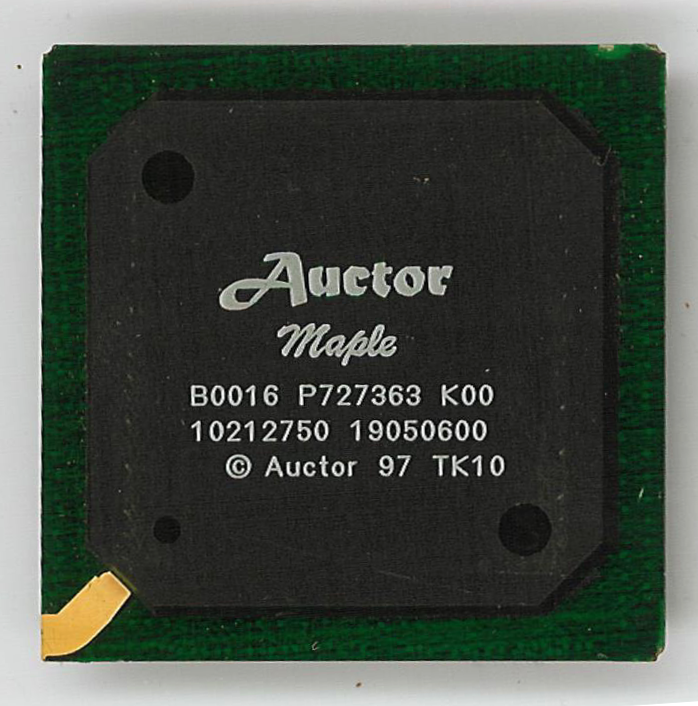
Auctor Maple SoC

- DM&P Electronics Vortex86
- ZF Micro ZFx86, Cx486DX SoC
- RDC Semiconductors x86 compatible RISC core (R8610，R8620，IAD series and EmKore series)RDC's newer SoC Series
- DP Kwazar SP (ДП КВАЗАР-ІС) - As of October 2024, КР1810ВМ86 (Soviet/Ukraine 8086 clone) still appears on Kwazar's price list.
- Xlichip (R30460 embedded microcontroller)

In the past:

- ALi / ULi / Nvidia - M6117C (386SX embedded microcontroller; went to ULi when ULi was spun off from ALi, then went to Nvidia when Nvidia acquired ULi)
- Auctor / ACC Micro - Maple SoC (Cx486DX4 core at 100 to 133 MHz)
- Advantech - EVA-X4150 and EVA-X4300 (SoCs with 486SX-compatible processors at 150 MHz and 300 MHz, respectively)
- Innovasic - pin-compatible 80186/80188 clones
- Infinior - IMS16 series (Am186EM-compatible microcontrollers)
- Vadem - VG230 and VG330 (SoCs with NEC V30 CPU cores, manufacturing continued by Amphus)
- SiS - SiS 55x (SoCs with Rise mP6-based CPU cores; About 200x,DM&P rebranded it to "original Vortex86")
- Bandai - SPGY-1000 series (SoCs with 186-compatible NEC V30MZ CPU cores, used in the WonderSwan series of handheld game consoles)
- VAutomation - offered synthesizable x86 cores, in particular the Turbo 186, that has been implemented in ASICs from numerous vendors, e.g.
  - Zoran Corporation: Vaddis 6
  - Genesis Microchip Inc: GM1601
  - Lantronix: DSTni-EX, DSTni-LX
  - Synergetic: EC-1
  - Pixelworks: PW164
- CAST — offered synthesizable x86 and x87 IP cores for use in ASICs and FPGAs, such as the C80186XL, C80187, and C387L.
- STMicroelectronics: STPC Atlas (486 core at up to 133 MHz, embedded 2D graphics)

== Open source x86 cores ==
- ao486 open source FPGA implementation of the 486SX (currently targets the Terasic Altera DE2-115)
- S80186 open source 80186 compatible FPGA implementation
- Zet open source 80186 compatible FPGA implementation targeting the Xilinx ML403 and Altera DE1

== x86-SoCs for mobile devices ==
- Rockchip (Intel SoFIA)
- Spreadtrum (Intel SoFIA)

== Manufacturing-only of x86-processors designed by others ==
- GlobalFoundries (manufactures processors for AMD)
- IBM (manufactured processors for ZF Micro, Cyrix, VIA, NexGen, and Transmeta)
- TSMC (manufactures processors for AMD and VIA; discontinued production for Transmeta)
- Fujitsu (manufactures processors for VIA; manufactured processors for Transmeta)

In the past:

- UMC (manufactured processors for Rise, SiS, ALi, ULi and Nvidia; discontinued x86 production)
- National Semiconductor (manufactured processors for ZF Micro; discontinued x86 production)
- DEC (manufactured 486 processors for AMD; discontinued x86 production)

== Manufactured and sold under its own name of x86-processors designed by others ==
Early Intel x86 CPU designs (up to the 80286) have in the past been second-sourced by the following manufacturers under licence from Intel:

Manufacturer	8086/8088	80186/80188	80286	Notes
AMD	Yes	Yes	Yes	Later developed independent x86 CPU designs.
Fujitsu	Yes	Yes	Yes	
Harris Corporation	Yes	No	Yes	
IBM	No	No	Yes	
Intersil	Yes	No	Yes	Continued to manufacture x86 CPUs after being spun off from Harris in 1999.
Matra Harris Semiconductors (MHS)	Yes	No	No	Joint venture between Harris and Matra.
Matsushita	Yes	No	No	
Mitsubishi	Yes	No	No	
NEC	Yes	No	No	Later developed independent x86 CPU designs.
OKI	Yes	No	No	
Renesas	Yes	No	No	Continued Intersil's 8086/8088 product line after acquiring Intersil in 2017.
Rochester Electronics (REI)	Yes	Yes	Yes	Manufactures other vendors' end-of-lifed chips under licence, on a built-to-order basis.
Siemens	Yes	Yes	Yes	

Manufacturers that have served as second sources for other x86 CPUs include:

Manufacturer	Second source of
Sharp	NEC V20/V30
Sony	NEC V20/V30
Zilog	NEC V20/V30
IBM	Cyrix 486, 5x86, 6x86, 6x86MX
SGS-Thomson	Cyrix 486, 5x86, 6x86
Texas Instruments	Cyrix 486
Rochester Electronics	AMD Élan SC300

== Other/uncategorized ==
Vendor	Product Line	Description
Montage Technology	Jintide	Pairs Intel Skylake Xeon CPU cores with specially designed I/O tracing and analysis chips to help provide improved security. Made as a multi-chip module, mainly for use in Chinese servers.
MCST	Elbrus 2000	Russian VLIW processor family, designed to run x86 code using dynamic binary translation.
Space Electronics Inc. / Maxwell	80386DXRP	Intel 386 CPUs repackaged in special radiation-hardened packages for use in space.
Kombinat Mikroelektronik Erfurt	U80601	East Germany 80286 clone, made in 1989–1990.
Eagle Memories, MC	486DLC	OEM rebranded variants of Cyrix 486DLC CPUs.
Mitsubishi	Straker	Intel SmartDie based products, packaging an Intel-provided CPU die in OEM-specific packages, mainly for use in ultracompact laptops.
MicroModule Systems (MMS)	Gemini	Intel SmartDie based products, packaging an Intel-provided CPU die in OEM-specific packages, mainly for use in ultracompact laptops.
Fujitsu	(Pentium)	Intel SmartDie based products, packaging an Intel-provided CPU die in OEM-specific packages, mainly for use in ultracompact laptops.
Shenzen State Microelectronics (SSMEC)	SM486DX, SM486DX2	Pin-compatible i486 clones. Functionally indistinguishable from Intel 486 processors, but draw substantially less power.

== See also ==
- List of former IA-32 compatible processor manufacturers
