= Sun Open Storage =

Open source computer data storage platform developed by Sun Microsystems

Sun Open Storage was an open source computer data storage platform developed by Sun Microsystems. Sun Open Storage was advertised as avoiding vendor lock-in.

== Background ==
Prior to Open Storage, most storage products were based on customized operating systems running on specialist hardware. In many cases, the specialist hardware was based on old generation hardware, because the customized operating systems were behind in support for current processors and system architectures. During the 2000s, the phenomenal growth in processor performance and processor multithreading left these (often single threaded) storage products with a significant internal processing gap versus current industry standard computers.

Open Storage is the concept of building storage products on current industry standard hardware using standard operating systems which have a large enough user and support base to be tracking current hardware (processors, threading, memory, controllers, flash, etc.), avoiding the costs of specialist hardware and custom operating systems, and the performance penalty of not being able to use current generation technologies.

Sun's Open Storage products were a combination of their server technologies and software, starting with Solaris 10 6/06 ("Update 2") in June 2006, which included ZFS and the set of protocols to build NAS, SAN, and local storage servers. Core features provided by Solaris included the operating environment, the ZFS file-system, the Network File System (NFS) and SMB protocol interfaces, Solaris Fault Management Architecture, and other core features. Sun produced the 7000 series Storage Appliance range, based on the Open Storage platform with closed source parts added to create a complete integrated storage appliance. Other companies such as Greenplum, Nexenta, Delphix, etc. also used the Sun Open Storage platform to produce storage products/appliances with various specialities.

Statements by Sun around their Open Storage products indicated that products based on common hardware and open source Solaris, would remove vendor lock-in for customers.

In 2008 Sun estimated that open storage products and related services would gain 12 percent of the storage market by 2011. Storage solutions from other vendors are closed systems, in which all the components must come from the vendor.

The move to create storage products based on software personalities, running on standard hardware are also part of a broader move within the system and storage industries. Companies including Dell, EMC, HP, IBM, NetApp and numerous smaller vendors all have been moving towards storage products based upon standard server hardware and customized software.

Following the acquisition of Sun by Oracle in 2010, Oracle stopped using the Open Storage branding and stopped selling the Open Storage hardware products (Storage Servers and JBODs) related to it. Oracle continued manufacturing some of these products only for sale as part of the 7000 series, rebranding them "Unified Storage" instead of "OpenStorage". However, by this time, many other vendors were selling Open Storage hardware.

Open Storage branding continued to be used by some of the other companies with Storage products based on Open Storage (ZFS and open sourced Solaris such as illumos), together with an annual Open Storage Summit, although Oracle has not participated.

== Technologies ==
At the storage protocol layer, OpenSolaris supported SCSI, iSCSI, iSNS, Fibre Channel, FCoE, InfiniBand, RDMA, Object storage device, and SAS.

=== Software ===
- OpenSolaris, or Illumos, or FreeBSD, or Linux using ZFS on Linux
- ZFS, NFS, and SMB
- NexentaStor, FreeNAS, SmartOS, OmniOS

=== Hardware platforms ===
- Sun Fire X4500
- Sun Storage J4500 Array
- Sun Storage 7000 Unified Storage
