= List of former IA-32 compatible processor manufacturers =

As Intel's 32-bit architecture became the dominant computing platform during the 1980s and 1990s, multiple companies have tried to build microprocessors that are compatible with that Intel instruction set architecture. Most of these companies were not successful in the mainstream computing market. So far, only AMD has had any market presence in the computing market for more than a couple of product generations. Cyrix was successful during the 386 and 486 generations of products but did not do well after the Pentium was introduced.

List of former IA-32 compatible microprocessor vendors:

== Progressed into surviving companies ==
- Centaur Technology – originally subsidiary of IDT, later acquired by VIA Technologies, still producing compatible low-end devices for VIA
- Cyrix – acquired by National Semiconductor, later acquired by VIA Technologies, eventually shut down
- NexGen – bought by AMD to help develop the successful K6 device
- National Semiconductor – low-end 486 (designed in-house) never widely sold; first acquirer of Cyrix, later keeping only low-end IA-32 devices targeted for consumer System-on-a-chips, finally selling them to AMD

== Product discontinued/transformed ==
- Harris Corporation – sold radiation-hardened versions of the 8086 and 80286; product line discontinued. Produced 20 MHz and 25 MHz 80286s (some motherboards were equipped with cache memory, which was unusual for 80286 processors).
- NEC – sold processors, such as NEC V20 and NEC V30, that were compatible with early Intel 16-bit architectures; product line transitioned to NEC-designed architectures.
- Siemens – sold versions of the 8086 and 80286; product line discontinued.
- V.M. Technology – developed VM860 (8086-compatible processor), VM8600SP (80286 compatibility with proprietary 32-bit extensions), and VM386SX+ (Intel 386SX pin compatible processor) for the Japanese market.

== Left the market or closed ==
- Chips and Technologies – left market after failed 386 compatible chip failed to boot the Windows operating system
- IBM – Cyrix licensee and developer of Blue Lightning 486 line of processors, eventually left compatible chip market
- Rise Technology – after five years of working on the slow mP6 chip (released in 1998), the company closed a year later
- Texas Instruments and SGS-Thomson – licensees of Cyrix designs, eventually left compatible chip market
- Transmeta – transitioned to an intellectual property company in 2005
- United Microelectronics Corporation and Meridian Semiconductor – got out of market after a suit from Intel questioning the legality of copying Intel origin x86 microcode

== Incomplete/unsuccessful projects ==
- Mostek — obtained a licence to second-source the Intel 8086, but cancelled it due to lack of support from Intel.
- Chromatic Research / ATI Technologies — x86/RISC dual instruction set processor codenamed "Tapestry" never completed
- Exponential Technology — x86-compatible microprocessor never completed
- S-MOS — 486-compatible project was canceled
- IBM — x86/PowerPC dual instruction set processor "PowerPC 615" never entered mass production
- IIT Corp — 486-compatible project never completed
- International Meta Systems — Pentium/PPro-class processors "Meta 6000", "Meta 6500", "Meta 7000/BiFrost" never completed
- Texas Instruments — internally developed Pentium-class processor "Amazon"/"Dakota" - taped out, but was canceled at the end of 1996
- MemoryLogix — multi-threaded CPU core "MLX1" and SOC for PCs never completed
- Metaflow Technologies — 486-class processor "CP100" never released
- Montalvo Systems — asymmetric multiprocessor never completed
- ULSI System Technology — company shut down after protracted legal battle with Intel over 387 floating-point co-processor patents
- VLSI Technology — developed 386SX-based "Polar" SoC in collaboration with Intel - canceled due to low performance and lack of software support
- KAIST — developed but did not commercialize Intel-compatible processors HK386 and K486.
- Henry Wong — developed a 2-way superscalar, out-of-order execution, 32-bit x86 processor soft core running at over 200 MHz on Altera Stratix IV FPGA.
- Nvidia — Project Denver was originally intended to support the x86 instruction set, but was eventually released with support for the ARM instruction set instead.

== See also ==
- List of x86 manufacturers
