= Zembly =

zembly
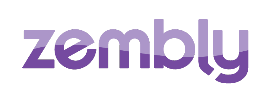
- Website type: Cloud-based Development Platform
- Headquarters: Menlo Park, CA
- Creator: Sun Microsystems
- Industry: Computer software
- Website: zembly.com
- Launched: June 2008
- Current status: closed down

Zembly (styled zembly) was a browser-based development environment from Sun Microsystems that enabled social programming of applications for Facebook, Meebo, OpenSocial, iPhone web applications, and other social platforms, as well as web widgets. Users of zembly interacted with one another via zembly's social networking features to engage in co-development of applications for these platforms. It was available from 2008 to 2009.

In addition to the development environment, the zembly platform, provided the ability to consume Web APIs (RESTful web services) in zembly applications as well as externally using the open source zembly client library (with language bindings for Java and JavaFx). This functionality provided a consistent programming model across various API providers.

Zembly combined features from traditional IDEs (such as a rich scripting editor) with wiki- and social-networking-based technologies to attempt to innovate on the application development paradigm for smaller-sized applications. Applications created at zembly were automatically and transparently deployed, hosted, and scaled on its underlying cloud computing infrastructure.

== Architecture ==
Zembly was run as a product within Sun Microsystems's cloud computing organization, with the hosting of the website and developer applications provided by Network.com's compute cloud. It was built on a stack consisting largely of Sun technologies, including Solaris 10, Java, the GlassFish application server, and MySQL. The software stack ran on a horizontally scaled cluster of Sun Fire T2000 ("Niagara") and X4500 ("Thumper") servers. In addition, zembly used Apache and memcached. Zembly had also incorporated (and contributed to) Mozilla Bespin.

== Closure ==
In November 2009 zembly announced that the site would be closed on November 30, 2009 and that "once the site is shutdown, all your applications and services on zembly will be unavailable". Some Zembly developers have expressed frustration about Zembly abandoning them without even open-sourcing their code.
