= WebRunner =

WebRunner or Webrunner may refer to:

- a historical name for HotJava web browser
- Netrunner, a game
- Mozilla Prism, a discontinued XULRunner site-specific browser, now being maintained under its former name of WebRunner
