= Metaflow Technologies =

American microprocessor design company, 1988–1998

Metaflow Technologies was a microprocessor design company based in La Jolla, California. It was founded in 1988 by Val Popescu, Merle Schultz, Gary Gibson, John Spracklen, and Bruce Lightner.

The company is not well known to the general public as none of its designs were ever manufactured in volume. The company is known within the computer architecture community as it published articles in technical journals in the early 1990s that described how an out-of-order with speculative execution CPU might be designed. This was one of the first publicly disclosed OoO designs from a non-academic source.

Described as specialising in VLIW (Very Long Instruction Word) technology, this having been licensed to Intel, Metaflow announced a collaboration with LSI Logic and Hyundai to develop a CMOS-based SPARC processor codenamed Lightning capable of achieving a performance of 80 MIPS, being around double that of some contemporary SPARC designs. The product itself was a multi-chip processor designed according to the architectural principles previously published by the company. The chips were designed and built by LSI Logic, but that support went away before full production could be reached.

The Thunder project was a follow-on that was funded by Hyundai. Hyundai gained control of the company in 1994. This project did not go into production either.

The company was acquired by ST Microelectronics (called SGS Thomson Microelectronics at the time) in 1998. ST Micro originally wanted this design team to work on an Intel IA-32 clone, but eventually the team was used for non-personal computer SOCs.

It is rumored that Metaflow collaborated with the Intel team that would eventually design the Pentium Pro, the first commercially available Out-of-Order x86 processor.

Following STMicroelectronics' acquisition in May 1997 of a majority stake in Metaflow, the relationship between the companies soured. Sources indicate that the two were unable to agree on which direction to take Metaflow's technology, creating a rift that resulted in ST's buying out Metaflow's last remaining founders: President Val Popescu, Vice President Bruce Lightner, and Director of Engineering Gary Gibson. Gibson has since taken a position with Mosart Systems, working on some as-yet-undisclosed new processor.

The originator of much of the technology underlying today's superscalar out-of-order microprocessors, Metaflow was never able to reap its just rewards. Begun in 1985, the company's first project, a SPARC-based ECL gate-array processor, was supplanted in 1989 by Lightning, a CMOS design backed by funding and IC-design resources from Hyundai. But the division of labor between the two companies proved stormy, and in 1991 Lightning was discharged, creating Thunder—a 0.8-micrometre three-chip processor designed entirely by Metaflow. In 1995, the company successfully demonstrated an 80-MHz Thunder processor—which delivered 2.5 SPECint92/MHz—just as Hyundai decided it wanted x86-based processors instead of SPARCs.

Metaflow had a brush with success in the early 1990s when, working under contract to Intel, it convinced the processor giant that out-of-order design offered the best hope for building fast x86 processors. In fact, sources indicate that inside Intel the P6 was initially referred to as the "Metaflow processor." Sources have also revealed that Intel actually tried to buy Metaflow, but Andy Grove, unable to come to terms with Hyundai, had to abort the purchase.

Intel subsequently acquired the IP rights to Metaflow's technology through a patent cross-license with Hyundai for DRAM technology. The Pentium Pro using a centralized reservation station and instant repair of out-of-order and speculative execution, bears the clear mark of Metaflow¹s involvement. More than 150 Intel patents cite Metaflow intellectual property as prior art. In 1997, frustrated by the inability to control its own IP and thus its own destiny, Metaflow convinced Hyundai to sell out to ST. Since then, ST and Metaflow have been jointly developing an x86-based processor. But, already unhappy with ST's plans for that part as well as with its lackluster process technology, Metaflow's leaders were pushed over the brink when ST traded Metaflow's IP to IBM in an x86-for-PowerPC swap.

Some Metaflow designers continue to work on ST's x86 project, but with the leaders gone and ST more interested in the low end of the x86 market, chances are slim that the x86 chip will ever see daylight—especially now that ST has a Pentium-class x86 project under way in India. ST officials declined to comment, other than to acknowledge that ST has indeed taken full ownership of Metaflow and to express confidence in the design team that remains.
