= HotJava Views =

Productivity software suite

HotJava Views was a productivity software suite developed by Sun Microsystems and implemented in Java. It was released in 1996 and was intended primarily for JavaStation or other JavaOS-based network computers.

HotJava Views consisted of four applications:

MailView
IMAP4 e-mail client
CalendarView
Group scheduling
WebView
HotJava web browser
NameView
Directory services

The graphical user interface of HotJava Views was quite novel in that it dispensed with some of the common features of GUIs in order to simplify the interface. Menu bars and overlapping, resizable windows were eliminated, and a simple Selector icon bar was used to switch between applications. Other third-party Java applications could be added to the Selector.
