= IA-32 =

32-bit version of x86 architecture

IA-32 (short for "Intel Architecture, 32-bit", commonly called i386) is the 32-bit version of the x86 instruction set architecture, designed by Intel and first implemented in the 80386 microprocessor in 1985. IA-32 is the first incarnation of x86 that supports 32-bit computing; as a result, the "IA-32" term may be used as a metonym to refer to all x86 versions that support 32-bit computing.

Within various programming language directives, IA-32 is still sometimes referred to as the "i386" architecture. In some other contexts, certain iterations of the IA-32 ISA are sometimes labelled i486, i586 and i686, referring to the instruction supersets offered by the 80486, the P5 and the P6 microarchitectures respectively. These updates offered numerous additions alongside the base IA-32 set including floating-point capabilities and the MMX extensions.

Intel was historically the largest manufacturer of IA-32 processors, with the second biggest supplier having been AMD. During the 1990s, VIA, Transmeta and other chip manufacturers also produced IA-32 compatible processors (e.g. WinChip). In the modern era, Intel still produced IA-32 processors under the Intel Quark microcontroller platform until 2019; however, since the 2000s, the majority of manufacturers (Intel included) moved almost exclusively to implementing CPUs based on the 64-bit variant of x86, x86-64. x86-64, by specification, offers legacy operating modes that operate on the IA-32 ISA for backwards compatibility. Even given the contemporary prevalence of x86-64, as of today, IA-32 protected mode versions of many modern operating systems are still maintained, e.g. Microsoft Windows (up to Windows 10), Windows Server (up to Windows Server 2008) and the Debian Linux distribution. In spite of IA-32's name (and causing some potential confusion), the 64-bit evolution of x86 that originated out of AMD would not be known as "IA-64", that name instead belonging to Intel's discontinued Itanium architecture.

== Architectural features ==
The primary defining characteristic of IA-32 is the availability of 32-bit general-purpose processor registers (for example, EAX and EBX), 32-bit integer arithmetic and logical operations, 32-bit offsets within a segment in protected mode, and the translation of segmented addresses to 32-bit linear addresses. The designers took the opportunity to make other improvements as well. Some of the most significant changes (relative to the 16-bit 286 instruction set) are:

32-bit integer capability
All general-purpose registers (GPRs) are expanded from 16 bits to 32 bits, and all arithmetic and logical operations, memory-to-register and register-to-memory operations, etc., can operate directly on 32-bit integers. Pushes and pops on the stack default to 4-byte strides, and non-segmented pointers are 4 bytes wide.
More general addressing modes
Any GPR can be used as a base register, and any GPR other than ESP can be used as an index register, in a memory reference. The index register value can be multiplied by 1, 2, 4, or 8 before being added to the base register value and displacement.
Additional segment registers
Two additional segment registers, FS and GS, are provided.
Larger virtual address space
The IA-32 architecture defines a 48-bit segmented address format, with a 16-bit segment number and a 32-bit offset within the segment. Segmented addresses are mapped to 32-bit linear addresses.
Demand paging
32-bit linear addresses are virtual addresses rather than physical addresses; they are translated to physical addresses through a page table. In the 80386, 80486, and the original Pentium processors, the physical address was 32 bits; in the Pentium Pro and later processors, the Physical Address Extension allowed 36-bit physical addresses, although the linear address size was still 32 bits.

== Operating modes ==
Operating mode	Operating system required	Type of code being run	Default address size	Default operand size	Typical GPR width
Protected mode	32-bit operating system or boot loader	32-bit protected-mode code	32 bits	32 bits	32 bits
Protected mode	16-bit protected-mode operating system or boot loader, or 32-bit boot loader	16-bit protected-mode code	16 bits	16 bits	16 or 32 bits
Virtual 8086 mode	16- or 32-bit protected-mode operating system	16-bit real-mode code	16 bits	16 bits	16 or 32 bits
Real mode	16-bit real-mode operating system or boot loader, or 32-bit boot loader	16-bit real-mode code	16 bits	16 bits	16 or 32 bits
Unreal mode	16-bit real-mode operating system or boot loader, or 32-bit boot loader	16-bit real-mode code	32 bits	16 bits	16 or 32 bits

== See also ==
- x86-64
- IA-64
- List of former IA-32 compatible processor manufacturers
- Speculative execution CPU vulnerabilities
