= Rochester Electronics =

American technology company

Rochester Electronics, LLC
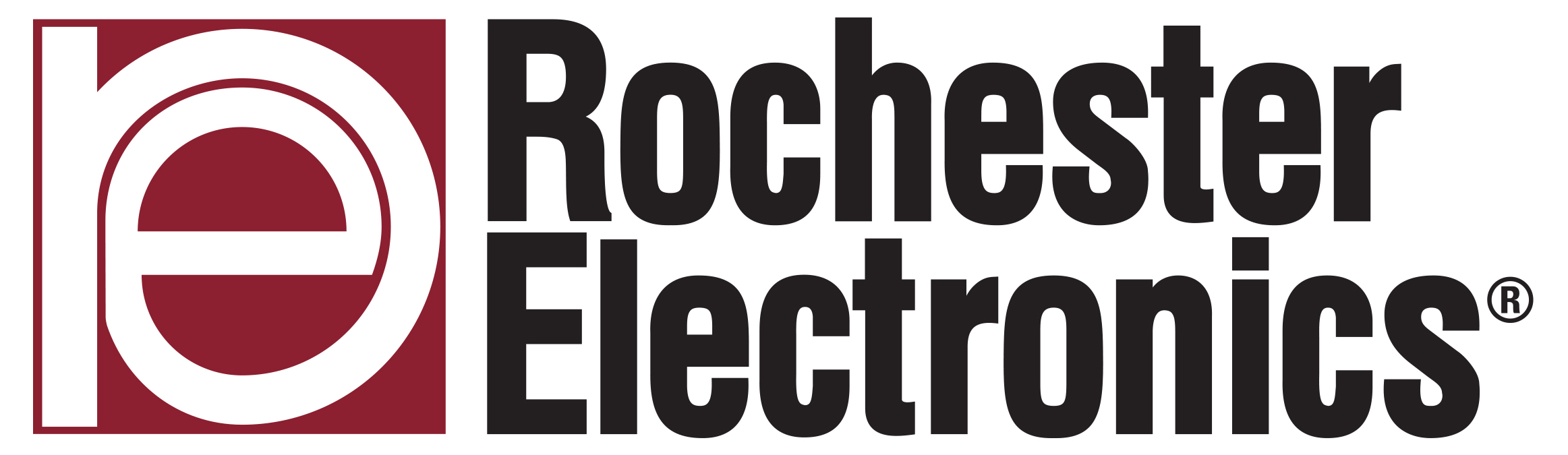
- Company type: Private
- Industry: Electronics
- Founded: 1981 Rochester, New Hampshire, United States
- Founder: Curt Gerrish
- Headquarters: Newburyport, Massachusetts, United States
- Key people: Curt Gerrish, Founder & CEO Chris Gerrish, Co-President Paul Gerrish, Co-President
- Products: Semiconductors
- Number of employees: 700+
- Website: www.rocelec.com

Rochester Electronics, LLC is a privately owned American technology company headquartered in Newburyport, Massachusetts, United States that manufactures and globally distributes semiconductors that are either obsolete or nearing the end of their product lifecycle. The company is authorized by over 70 semiconductor manufacturers and is licensed to manufacture and distribute semiconductors that are no longer produced by the original manufacturer.

== History ==
Rochester Electronics was founded in 1981 by Curt Gerrish. Gerrish started his career at Motorola where he remained for two decades. It was at Motorola that he learned of the challenge major corporations and government agencies face when a semiconductor nears the end of its product lifecycle.

Gerrish found that a semiconductor's product lifecycle is much shorter than that of the product in which it is placed. Realizing there was a need for the distribution of end-of-life semiconductor products when no longer supported by the original manufacturer, he left his position at Motorola and started Rochester Electronics.

In March 1998, Rochester Electronics signed a Discontinued Parts Agreement with Cypress Semiconductor Corp (acquired by Infineon Technologies), which gave Rochester rights to distribute discontinued Cypress products.

Digi-Key, an electronic components distributor, and Rochester Electronics partnered in 2021 to continue the supply of critical and authentic components despite the COVID-19 pandemic, supply chain uncertainties, and the rise of counterfeit components. In June 2021, the company joined the Digi-Key Marketplace to continue the supply chain for Digi-Key customers.

The company signed a collaboration agreement with STMicroelectronics in September 2021 for the purpose of enhancing and providing a broader range “of both active and end-of-life stocked products.”

In March 2022, Rochester Electronics partnered with Kyoto Semiconductor, an optical device manufacturer. This agreement allowed for Rochester customers to receive Kyoto Semiconductor optical device solutions.

== Licensed manufacturing ==
Rochester Electronics owns more than 12 billion silicon die which are stored in nitrogen-purged dry boxes, and billions more finished devices warehoused in temperature and humidity-controlled facilities, giving them the capability to manufacture over 70,000 device types. In addition to distributing discontinued semiconductors, they assemble and test products as a semiconductor manufacturer licensed under the original manufacturer.

They also have the ability to replicate parts that no longer have available silicon or design documents. These methods and abilities, for example, can help extend the life of components such as those in medical devices.

== Locations ==
- Headquartered in Newburyport, Massachusetts, United States
- Design and technology centers located in Rockville, Maryland and Burnsville, Minnesota
- Regional headquarters in Singapore; Tokyo, Japan; and Cambridgeshire, United Kingdom
- Sales offices in Munich, Germany; Shanghai, China; and Chandler, Arizona

== Semiconductor anti-counterfeit awareness ==
Since semiconductors are engineered within an incalculable number of critical systems and products such as airplanes, trains, lifesaving health equipment, etc. a failure of one has the potential to pose considerable risk to the health and safety of people around the globe. There have been several documented incidents of counterfeit semiconductors causing and/or potentially causing serious health and safety issues. In 2006, Rochester Electronics initiated the formation of the Semiconductor Industry Association's [SIA] Anti-Counterfeiting Task Force (ACTF). They remain an active participant promoting best procurement practices and the importance of avoiding counterfeit and substandard semiconductors.
