= Sun Constellation System =

Computing system

Sun Constellation System is an open petascale computing environment introduced by Sun Microsystems in 2007.

== Main hardware components ==
- Sun Blade 6048 Modular System
  - Sun Blade X6275
  - Sun Blade X6270
- Sun Blade 6000 System
- Sun Datacenter Switch 3456
- Sun Fire X4540
- Sun Cooling Doors (5200,5600)

== Software stack ==
- OpenSolaris or Linux
- Sun Grid Engine
- Sun Studio Compiler Suite
- Fortress (programming language)
- Sun HPC ClusterTools (based on Open MPI)
- Sun Ops Center

== Services ==
- Sun Datacenter Express Services

== Production systems ==
Signage and view of the "Ranger" computer cluster at TACC

Ranger at the Texas Advanced Computing Center (TACC) was the largest production Constellation system. Ranger had 62,976 processor cores in 3,936 nodes and a peak performance of 580 TFlops. Ranger was the 7th most powerful TOP500 supercomputer in the world at the time of its introduction. After 5 years of service at TACC, it was dismantled and shipped to South Africa, Tanzania, and Botswana to help foster HPC development in Africa.

A number of smaller Constellation systems are deployed at other supercomputer centers, including the University of Oslo.
