= Sun Fire X4500 =

The Sun Fire X4500 data server (code named Thumper) integrates server and storage technologies. It was announced in July, 2006 and is part of the Sun Fire server line from Sun Microsystems.

In July 2008, Sun announced the X4540 model (code-named Thor), which doubles the processing power of the X4500.

In November 2010, Oracle designated that the X4540 is end-of-life and has no next-generation replacement model.

== Development ==
Thumper was developed by Palo Alto, California based company Kealia inc. Kealia was founded in 2001 by Stanford University professor David Cheriton and Sun co-founder Andy Bechtolsheim. When Sun bought Kealia in 2004, Thumper became the basis for the X4500 model.

== Hardware ==
The Sun Fire X4500 supports two dual-core AMD Opteron processors and up to 64 GB RAM. With forty-eight 500/1000/2000 GB SATA drives, it provides up to 96 TB of raw storage in four rack units.

The Sun Fire X4540 supports two quad- or six-core AMD K10 (Barcelona) processors and up to 128 GB RAM. The new model also uses PCI Express IO technology, and added a compact flash disk slot for booting the operating system.

A significant feature of both systems is that the I/O framework was designed to handle high throughput on all disks simultaneously. These were the first systems designed specifically with ZFS in mind, so no hardware RAID is included.

== Supported operating systems ==
- Solaris 10
- Red Hat Enterprise Linux 4.0
- SUSE Linux Enterprise Server 10
- Rocks Cluster Distribution
- Microsoft Windows Server 2003 (Standard and Enterprise)
- Microsoft Windows Server 2008
- FreeNAS 9.3 - newer do not work

== Products using X4500/X4540 ==
- Sun Streaming System
- Sun Visualization System
- Sun Secure Data Retrieval Server (SDRS)
- Sun Constellation System
- Sun StorageTek Virtual Tape Library Value ("VTL Value") System
- Sun Scalable Storage Cluster
- Luminex Virtual Tape Solution for IBM zSeries mainframes via FICON
- SAS Intelligence Storage
- Greenplum's Sun Data Warehouse Appliance
- IPConfigure - Enterprise Surveillance Manager
- G10 Enterprise Video Manager
- Media Server for Symantec Veritas NetBackup
- Cypress Storage Appliance
- Internet Archive

Forty-two Sun Fire X4500 data servers are used to provide Lustre cluster filesystem storage in the TSUBAME supercomputer, which was number 7 in June 2006 TOP500 list.

== TPC-H World Record ==
In October 2007, Sun submitted TPC-H result with an X4500 running Sybase IQ. At US $8.11/QphH, it achieved the best price/performance among the 1,000 GB results.
