= Montalvo Systems =

Montalvo Systems was a Silicon Valley start-up reportedly working on an asymmetrical, x86 capable processor similar to the Cell microprocessor. The processor was to use high-performance cores for performance-intensive threads, and delegate minor tasks to the simpler cores to save silicon and power. Matt Perry, former Transmeta CEO, was CEO and president of Montalvo; Peter Song, founder of failed x86 manufacturer MemoryLogix, was chief architect. Greg Favor (former NexGen/AMD) was responsible for chip microarchitecture and Carlos Puchol (former architect for power management at Transmeta and Nvidia) was system and power architect. Another founding member, Kevin Lawton, of bochs (x86 emulation) and plex86 (x86 virtualization) fame, was the processor simulator architect.

The official description of business from Montalvo's security filings was:

A fabless semiconductor company developing ultra low-power system-on-chips for mobile devices.

As of 24 April 2008, Sun Microsystems had acquired the company's assets for an undisclosed sum.

== Locations ==
Headquarters were in Santa Clara, California, next door to the remnants of Transmeta, and nearby to Intel and Sun. It had offices in Boulder, Colorado and Bangalore, India. According to news reports, it had close to 300 employees.

In March 2008 news broke that Montalvo was seeking funds to avoid shutdown. According to a news article released on March 31, Montalvo had laid off two-thirds of its engineers. At the same time, rumors surfaced that Sun Microsystems was in talks to buy Montalvo. About three weeks later, on 24 April 2008, The Register confirmed the rumors to be true.

== Finances ==
From the Cal-EASI database, the following information is available about Montalvo's financing.

| Date | Type | Amount | Notes |
|---|---|---|---|
| 2005-05-03 | Series A | $1,997,751.36 | non-money, assumption of previous company's financing? |
| 2005-05-03 | Series A | $4,548,247.70 | |
| 2005-10-11 | Warrants | $302,000.00 | |
| 2005-10-24 | Series A | $9,548,247.70 | |
| 2006-03-10 | Series B | $26,299,998.53 | |
| 2007-08-29 | Bridge | $11,607,573.06 | subordinated convertible promissory notes |
| 2007-12-17 | Bridge | $20,000,000.00 | subordinated convertible promissory notes / warrants |

== News ==
- "Sun buys low-power x86 disaster Montalvo". The Register. 24 April 2008.
- "Sun Microsystems could use Montalvo as a strategic lever against Intel". VentureBeat. 3 April 2008.
- 2008-04-01 Sun close to buying Intel would-be competitor Montalvo
- "Montalvo Systems cuts two thirds of staff". VentureBeat. 31 March 2008.
- 2008-03-31 Rumor: Intel competitor Montalvo bracing for cuts
- "Montalvo seeking a hoard of cash to avoid shutdown". VentureBeat. 20 March 2008.
- 2008-02-18 VIA Continues Transition From Chipsets To CPU To Profitability. Skeptical on Montalvo X86 Chip Success
- 2008-02-15 Montalvo, a competitor of Intel and AMD, not yet born and already in trouble
- 2008-02-14 Secret recipe inside Intel's latest competitor
- "Cash-burning Montalvo tapes out Silverthorne rival". The Register. 13 February 2008.
- 2008-02-06 Silent start-up readies to take on Intel in notebooks
- 2007-06-05 Montalvo CFO leaves and joins Agami Systems
- "Is that a VMware CTO and Transmeta CEO at your start-up?". The Register. 25 August 2006.
- "Former Transmeta CEO goes at Intel with another low-power chip". The Register. 19 August 2006.
- "Chip start-up Montalvo looks to speed mobile devices". The Register. 27 October 2005.
