= U80601 =

Microprocessor

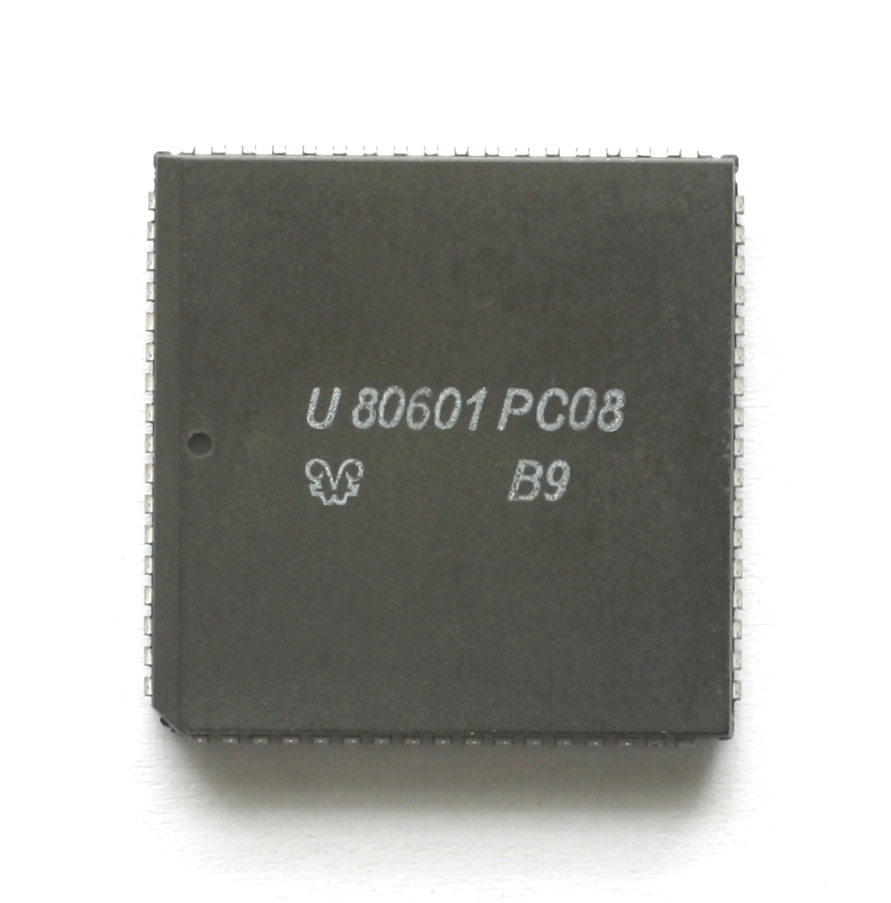
- U80601 (8 MHz version).

General information
- Launched: 1989
- Discontinued: 1990
- Common manufacturer: Kombinat Mikroelektronik Erfurt

Architecture and classification
- Instruction set: x86-16

The U80601 was a 16-bit microprocessor made in 1989-1990 by Kombinat Mikroelektronik Erfurt in the former German Democratic Republic of East Germany. It was manufactured in NMOS technology and encased in a PLCC or ceramic (CLCC) package (first samples).

This Central Processing Unit (CPU) was a near-identical copy of the Intel 80286 microprocessor. Because it was manufactured in East Germany it was not within Intel's legal power to stop it from being made or sold.

The U80600 system included the following chips:

- U80601: CPU (equiv. to Intel 80286)
- U80606: Bus controller (equiv. to Intel 82288)
- U80608: Error detection and correction (equiv. to Intel R8206)
- U80610: Memory controller for 16 kbit to 256 kbit DRAMs (equiv. to Intel R8207)

Planned, but never released:

- U80612: Clock generator (equiv. to DS80612, SAB82284)
- U80613: FPU (equiv. to Intel 80287 floating point math coprocessor)
- U80614, U80617, U80619: Rolanet 2 network controller (similar to Ethernet, IEEE 802.3)
- U80620: Integrated peripheral controller (CHIPS or SAB82C206)
- U80621: VGA graphics controller (equiv. to Tseng Labs ET3000)
- U80622: RAMDAC (equiv. to Inmos IMSG171P50)

== See also ==
- Comparison of chip photos from the Siemens 80286 and U 80601 (in German)
- U80601 RC06 in CLCC package
- U80601 RA04 in CLCC package
- D. Mandler, H. Berndt: Das schnelle 16-Bit-Mikroprozessorsystem U 80600. Mikroprozessortechnik 3, 1989, H. 5, S. 130–131, 4. Us. (in German)
- A. Fritzsche: 16-Bit-Mikroprozessor U 80601. In: Mikroprozessortechnik 3, 1989, H. 5, S. 132–136. (in German)
