= Intel 80286 =

Microprocessor model

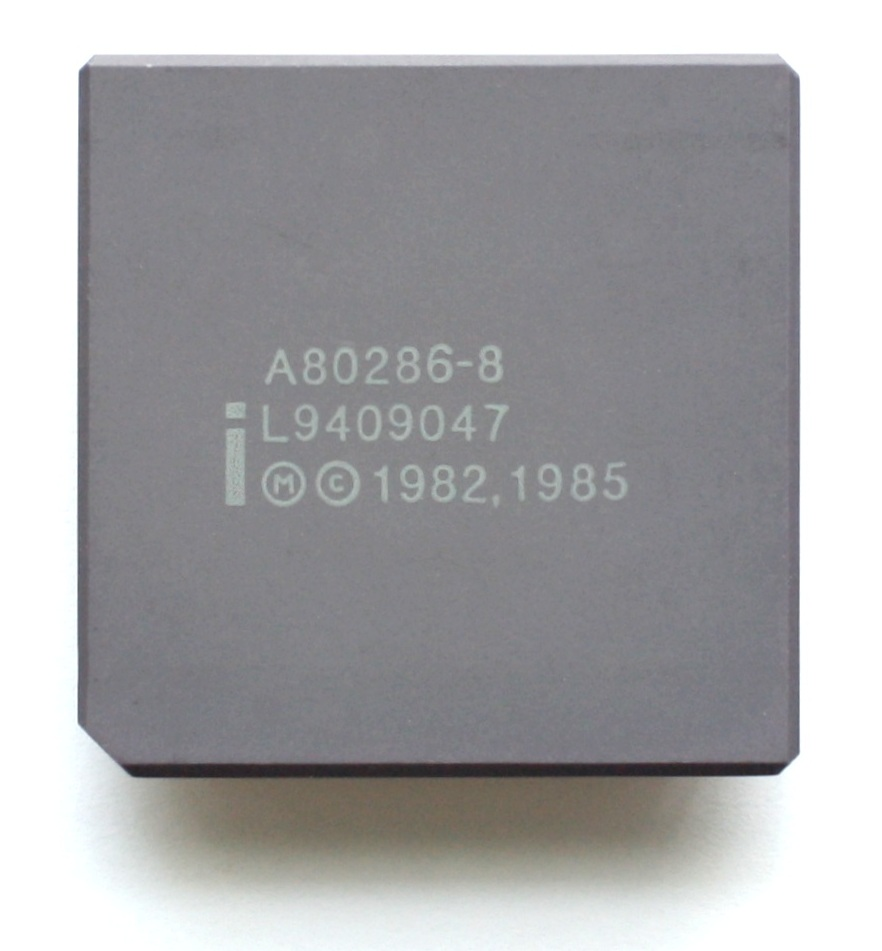
- An Intel A80286-8 processor in a ceramic package

General information
- Launched: February 1, 1982
- Discontinued: 1991
- Common manufacturer: Intel, IBM, AMD, Harris (Intersil), Siemens, Fujitsu

Performance
- Max. CPU clock rate: 4 MHz to 25 MHz
- FSB speeds: 4 MHz to 25 MHz
- Data width: 16 bits
- Address width: 24 bits

Physical specifications
- Transistors: 134,000
- Co-processor: 80287 (FPU)
- Packages: 68-pin PLCC; 68-pin LCC; 68-pin PGA

Architecture and classification
- Technology node: 1.5 μm
- Instruction set: x86-16 (with MMU)

Products, models, variants
- Variant: 80186

History
- Predecessors: 8086, 8088
- Successor: i386

Support status
- Unsupported

The Intel 80286 (also called the iAPX 286 or just 286) is a 16-bit microprocessor introduced by Intel on February 1, 1982, as the second generation of the x86 processor family. It added protected mode and 24-bit physical addressing while retaining object-code compatibility with software written for other x86 processors, including the earlier 8086 and 8088, and contemporary 80186.

It was the first 8086-based CPU with separate, non-multiplexed address and data buses and also the first with memory management and wide protection abilities. It had a data size of 16 bits, and had an address width of 24 bits, which could address up to 16MB of memory with a suitable operating system such as Windows compared to 1MB for the 8086. The 80286 used approximately 134,000 transistors in its original nMOS (HMOS) incarnation.

The 80286 was employed for the IBM PC/AT, introduced in 1984, and then widely used in most PC/AT compatible computers until the early 1990s. In 1987, Intel shipped its five-millionth 80286 microprocessor.

== History and performance ==
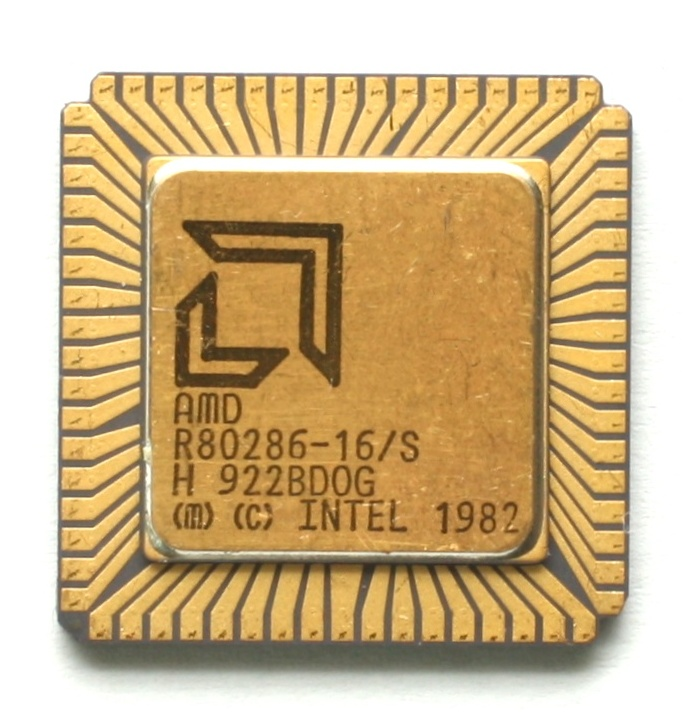
AMD 80286 (16 MHz version)

Intel's first 80286 chips were specified for a maximum clockrate of 5, 6 or 8 MHz and later releases for 12.5 MHz. AMD and Harris later produced 16 MHz, 20 MHz and 25 MHz parts. Intel, Intersil and Fujitsu also designed fully static CMOS versions of Intel's original depletion-load nMOS implementation, largely aimed at battery-powered devices. Intel's CMOS version of the 80286 was the 80C286.

On average, the 80286 was said to have a speed of about 0.21 instructions per clock on "typical" programs, although it could be significantly faster on optimized code and in tight loops, as many instructions could execute in 2 clock cycles each. The 6 MHz, 10 MHz, and 12 MHz models were reportedly measured to operate at 0.9 MIPS, 1.5 MIPS, and 2.66 MIPS respectively.

The later E-stepping level of the 80286 was free of the several significant errata that caused problems for programmers and operating-system writers in the earlier B-step and C-step CPUs (common in the AT and AT clones). This E-2 stepping part may have been available in later 1986.

Intel second sourced this microprocessor to Fujitsu Limited in about 1985.

=== Variants ===
Model number	Frequency	Technology	Process	Package	Date of release	Price USD (Note: In quantities of 100.)
80286-10	10 MHz	HMOS-III	1.5 μm		July/August 1985	$155
80286-12	12.5 MHz	HMOS-III	1.5 μm		July/August 1985	$260
MG80286					September/October 1985	$784
80286				68 Pin PGA (Note: Sampling Q3 1985)	January/February 1986	
80286				68 Pin PLCC (Note: Sampling Q2 1986)	January/February 1986	

== Architecture ==
Simplified 80286 microarchitecture

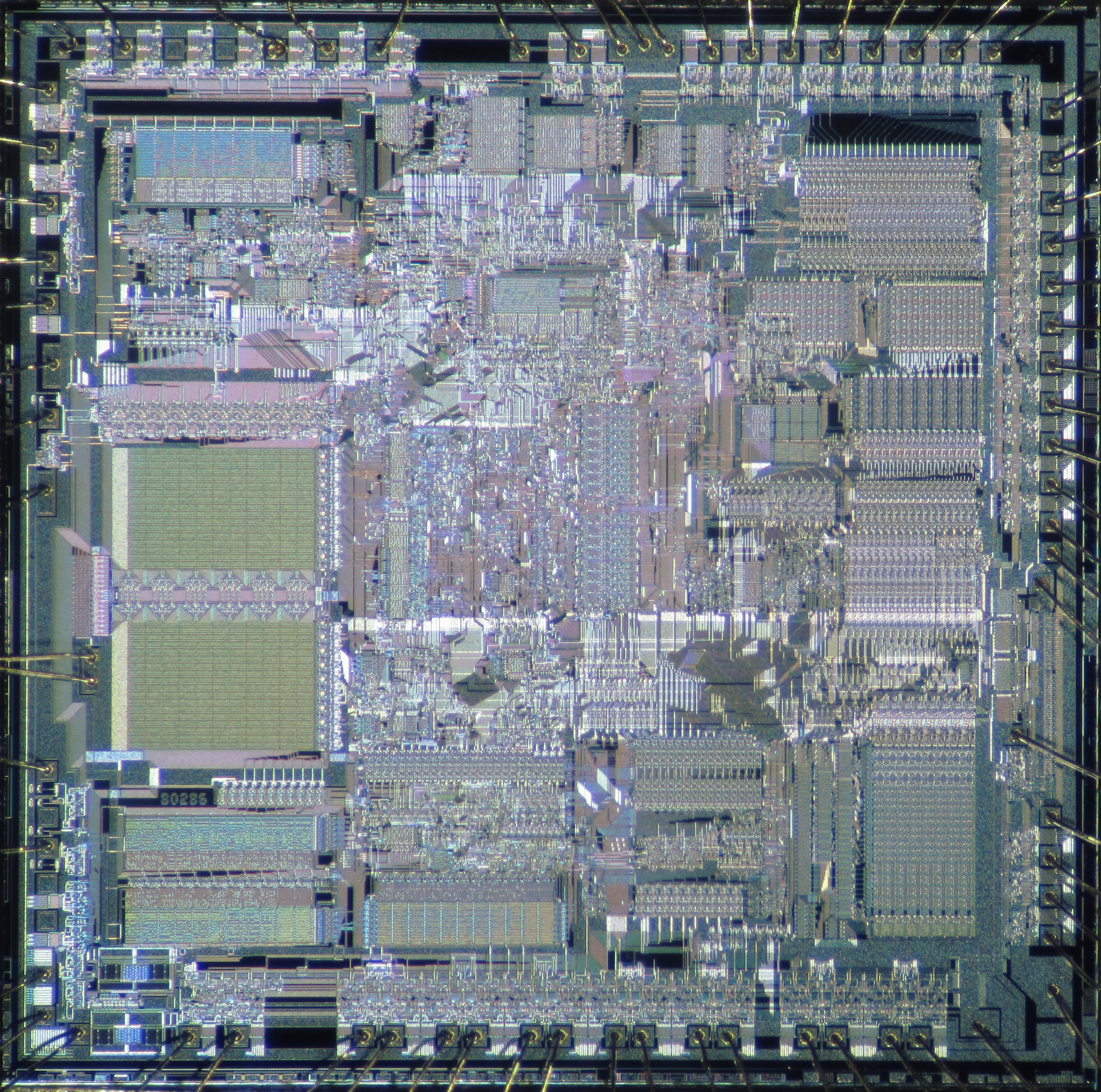
Intel 80286 die

Intel expected the 286 to be used primarily in industrial automation, transaction processing, and telecommunications, instead of in personal computers.

The CPU was designed for multi-user systems with multitasking applications, including communications (such as automated PBXs) and real-time process control. It had 134,000 transistors and consisted of four independent units: the address unit, bus unit, instruction unit, and execution unit, organized into a loosely coupled (buffered) pipeline, just as in the 8086. It was produced in a 68-pin package, including PLCC (plastic leaded chip carrier), LCC (leadless chip carrier) and PGA (pin grid array) packages.

The performance increase of the 80286 over the 8086 (or 8088) could be more than 100% per clock cycle in many programs (i.e., a doubled performance at the same clock speed). This was a large increase, fully comparable to the speed improvements seven years later when the i486 (1989) or the original Pentium (1993) were introduced. This was partly due to the non-multiplexed address and data buses, but mainly to the fact that address calculations (such as base+index) were less expensive. They were performed by a dedicated unit in the 80286, while the older 8086 had to do effective address computation using its general ALU, consuming several extra clock cycles in many cases. Also, the 80286 was more efficient in the prefetch of instructions, buffering, execution of jumps, and in complex microcoded numerical operations such as MUL/DIV than its predecessor.

The 80286 included, in addition to all of the 8086 instructions, all of the new instructions of the 80186: ENTER, LEAVE, BOUND, INS, OUTS, PUSHA, POPA, PUSH immediate, IMUL immediate, and immediate shifts and rotates. The 80286 also added new instructions for protected mode: ARPL, CLTS, LAR, LGDT, LIDT, LLDT, LMSW, LSL, LTR, SGDT, SIDT, SLDT, SMSW, STR, VERR, and VERW. Some of the instructions for protected mode can (or must) be used in real mode to set up and switch to protected mode, and a few (such as SMSW and LMSW) are useful for real mode itself.

The Intel 80286 had a 24-bit address bus and as such had a 16 MB physical address space, compared to the 1 MB address space of prior x86 processors. It was the first x86 processor to support virtual memory supporting up to 1 GB via segmentation. However, memory cost and the initial rarity of software using the memory above 1 MB meant that until late in its production, 80286 computers rarely shipped with more than 1 MB of RAM. Additionally, there was a performance penalty involved in accessing extended memory from real mode as noted below.

== Features ==
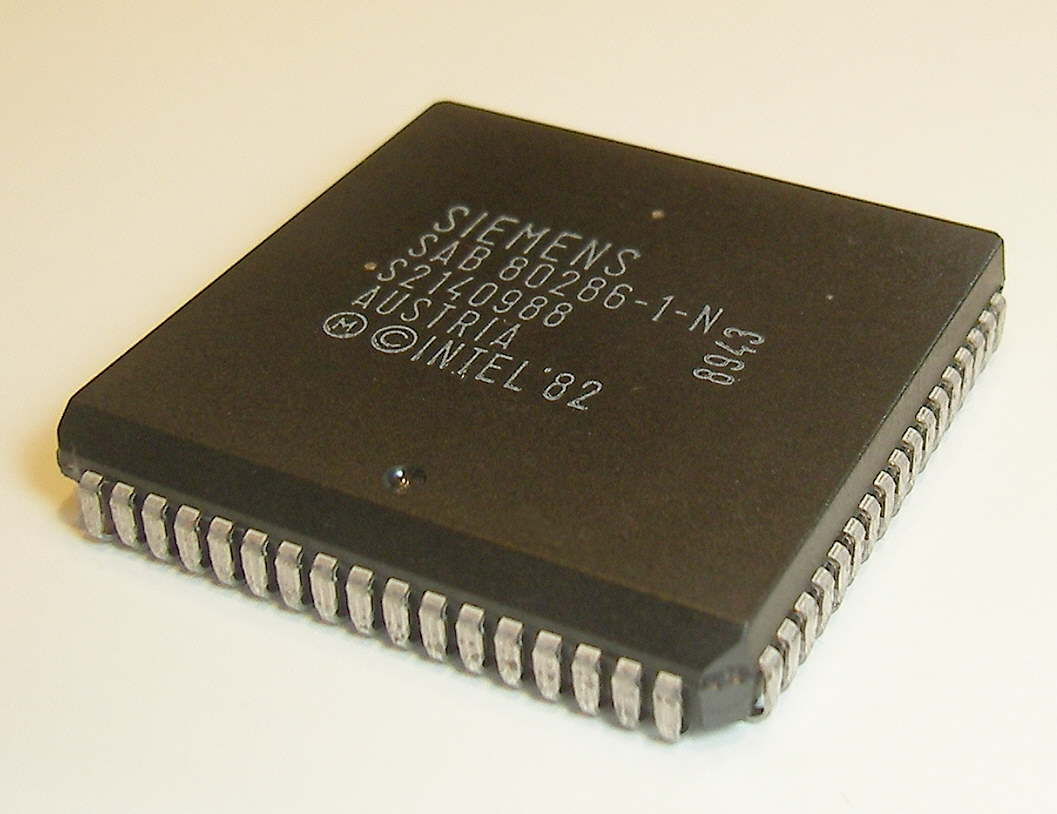
Siemens 80286 (10 MHz version)

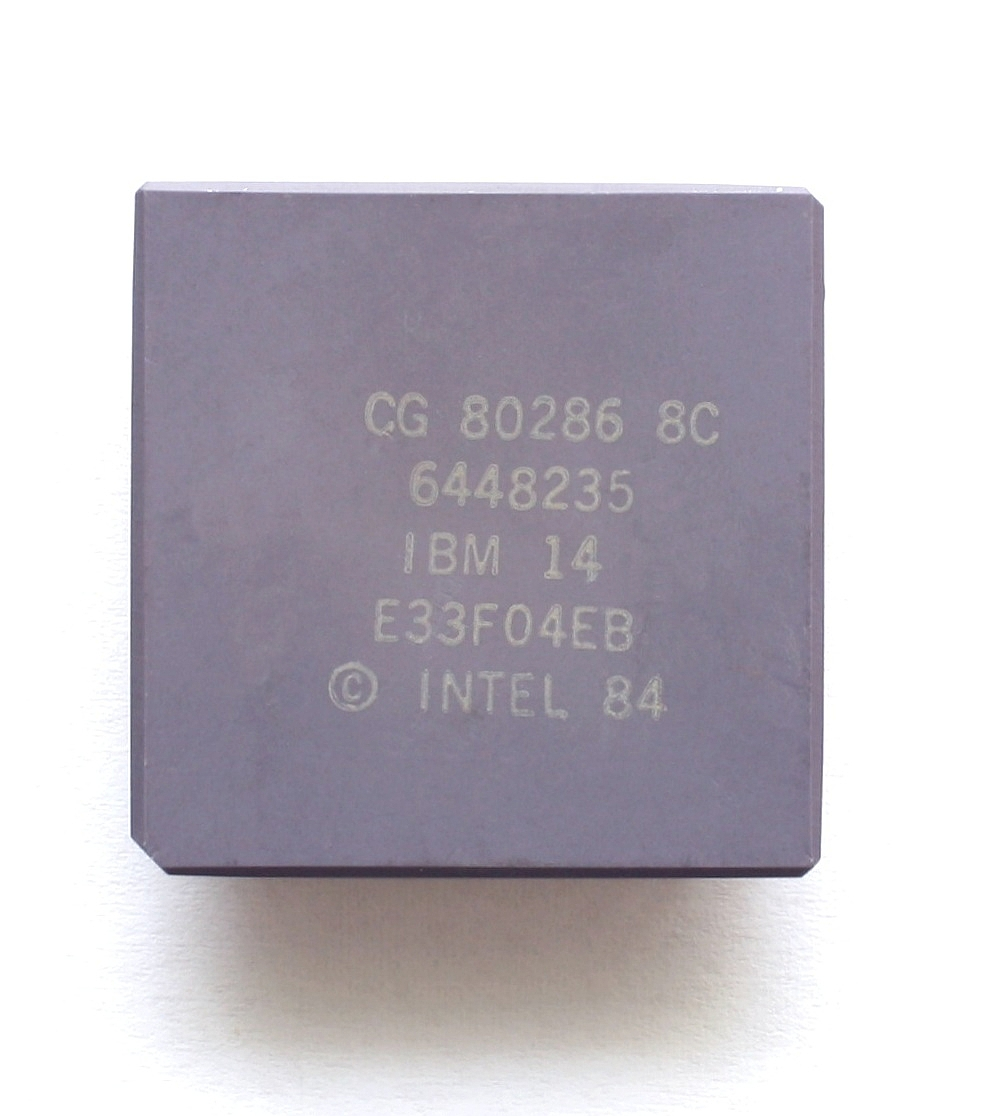
IBM 80286 (8 MHz version)

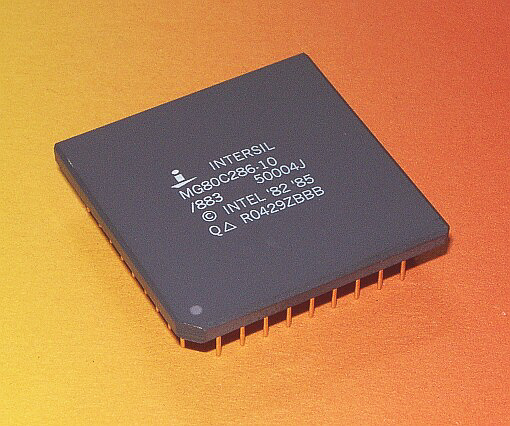
Intersil 80286 (10 MHz version)

=== Protected mode ===
The 286 was the first of the x86 CPU family to support protected virtual-address mode, commonly called "protected mode". In addition, it was the first commercially available microprocessor with on-chip memory management unit (MMU) capabilities (systems using the contemporaneous Motorola 68010 and NS320xx could be equipped with an optional MMU controller). This would allow IBM compatibles to have advanced multitasking OSes for the first time and compete in the Unix-dominated server/workstation market.

Several additional instructions were introduced in the protected mode of 80286, which are helpful for multitasking operating systems.

Another important feature of 80286 is the prevention of unauthorized access. This is achieved by:

- Forming different segments for data, code, and stack, and preventing their overlapping.
- Assigning privilege levels to each segment. Segments with lower privilege levels cannot access segments with higher privilege levels.

In 80286 (and in its co-processor Intel 80287), arithmetic operations can be performed on the following different types of numbers:

- unsigned packed decimal,
- unsigned binary,
- unsigned unpacked decimal,
- signed binary,
- floating-point numbers (only with an 80287).

By design, the 286 could not revert from protected mode to the basic 8086-compatible real address mode ("real mode") without a hardware-initiated reset. In the PC/AT introduced in 1984, IBM added external circuitry, as well as specialized code in the ROM BIOS and the 8042 keyboard microcontroller to enable software to cause the reset, allowing real-mode reentry while retaining active memory and returning control to the program that initiated the reset. (The BIOS is necessarily involved because it obtains control directly whenever the CPU resets.) Though it worked correctly, the method imposed a huge performance penalty.

In theory, real-mode applications could be directly executed in 16-bit protected mode if certain rules (newly proposed with the introduction of the 80286) were followed; however, as many DOS programs did not conform to those rules, protected mode was not widely used until the appearance of its successor, the 32-bit Intel 80386, which was designed to go back and forth between modes easily and to provide an emulation of real mode within protected mode. When Intel designed the 286, it was not designed to be able to multitask real-mode applications; real mode was intended to be a simple way for a bootstrap loader to prepare the system and then switch to protected mode; essentially, in protected mode the 80286 was designed to be a new processor with many similarities to its predecessors, while real mode on the 80286 was offered for smaller-scale systems that could benefit from a more advanced version of the 80186 CPU core, with advantages such as higher clock rates, faster instruction execution (measured in clock cycles), and unmultiplexed buses, but not the 24-bit (16 MB) memory space.

To support protected mode, new instructions have been added: ARPL, VERR, VERW, LAR, LSL, SMSW, SGDT, SIDT, SLDT, STR, LMSW, LGDT, LIDT, LLDT, LTR, CLTS. There are also new exceptions (internal interrupts): invalid opcode, coprocessor not available, double fault, coprocessor segment overrun, stack fault, segment overrun/general protection fault, and others only for protected mode.

=== OS support ===
The protected mode of the 80286 was not routinely utilized in PC applications until many years after its release, in part because of the high cost of adding extended memory to a PC, but also because of the need for software to support the large user base of 8086 PCs. For example, in 1986 the only program that made use of it was VDISK, a RAM disk driver included with PC DOS 3.0 and 3.1. PC DOS could use the additional RAM available in protected mode (extended memory) either via a BIOS call (INT 15h, AH=87h), as a RAM disk, or as emulation of expanded memory.

The difficulty lay in the incompatibility of older real-mode programs with protected mode. They could not natively run in this new mode without significant modification. In protected mode, memory management and interrupt handling were done differently than in real mode. In addition, DOS programs typically would directly access data and code segments that did not belong to them, as real mode allowed them to do without restriction; in contrast, the design intent of protected mode was to prevent programs from accessing any segments other than their own unless special access was explicitly allowed. While it was possible to set up a protected-mode environment that allowed all programs access to all segments (by putting all segment descriptors into the Global Descriptor Table (GDT) and assigning them all the same privilege level), this undermined nearly all of the advantages of protected mode except the extended (24-bit) address space. The choice that OS developers faced was either to start from scratch and create an OS that would not run the vast majority of the old programs, or to come up with a version of DOS that was slow and ugly (i.e., ugly from an internal technical viewpoint) but would still run a majority of the old programs. Protected mode also did not provide a significant enough performance advantage over the 8086-compatible real mode to justify supporting its capabilities; actually, except for task switches when multitasking, it yielded a performance disadvantage, by slowing down many instructions through a litany of added privilege checks. In protected mode, registers were still 16-bit, and the programmer was still forced to use a memory map composed of 64 kB segments, just like in real mode.

Intel had not expected the lack of virtual machine support for 8086 software to be a problem, because it thought that new software using all of the 80286's capabilities would quickly appear. Bill Gates referred to the 80286 as a "brain-damaged" chip, because it cannot use virtual machines to multitask multiple MS-DOS applications with an operating system like Microsoft Windows. It was arguably responsible for the split between Microsoft and IBM, since IBM insisted that OS/2, originally a joint venture between IBM and Microsoft, would run on a 286 (and in text mode).

In January 1985, Digital Research previewed the Concurrent DOS 286 1.0 operating system developed in cooperation with Intel. The product would function strictly as an 80286 native-mode (i.e. protected-mode) operating system, allowing users to take full advantage of the protected mode to perform multi-user, multitasking operations while running 8086 emulation. This worked on the B-1 prototype step of the chip, but Digital Research discovered problems with the emulation on the production level C-1 step in May, which would not allow Concurrent DOS 286 to run 8086 software in protected mode. The release of Concurrent DOS 286 was delayed until Intel would develop a new version of the chip. In August, after extensive testing on E-1 step samples of the 80286, Digital Research acknowledged that Intel corrected all documented 286 errata, but said that there were still undocumented chip performance problems with the prerelease version of Concurrent DOS 286 running on the E-1 step. Intel said that the approach Digital Research wished to take in emulating 8086 software in protected mode differed from the original specifications. Nevertheless, in the E-2 step, they implemented minor changes in the microcode that would allow Digital Research to run emulation mode much faster. Named IBM 4680 OS, IBM originally chose DR Concurrent DOS 286 as the basis of their IBM 4680 computer for IBM Plant System products and point-of-sale terminals in 1986. Digital Research's FlexOS 286 version 1.3, a derivation of Concurrent DOS 286, was developed in 1986, introduced in January 1987, and later adopted by IBM for their IBM 4690 OS, but the same limitations affected it.

Other operating systems that used the protected mode of the 286 were Microsoft Xenix (around 1984), Coherent, and Minix. These were less hindered by the limitations of the 80286 protected mode because they did not aim to run MS-DOS applications or other real-mode programs.

When designing the 80386 Intel engineers were aware of, and agreed with, the 80286's poor reputation. They enhanced the 80386's protected mode to address more memory, and also added the separate virtual 8086 mode, a mode within protected mode with much better MS-DOS compatibility.

== Support components ==
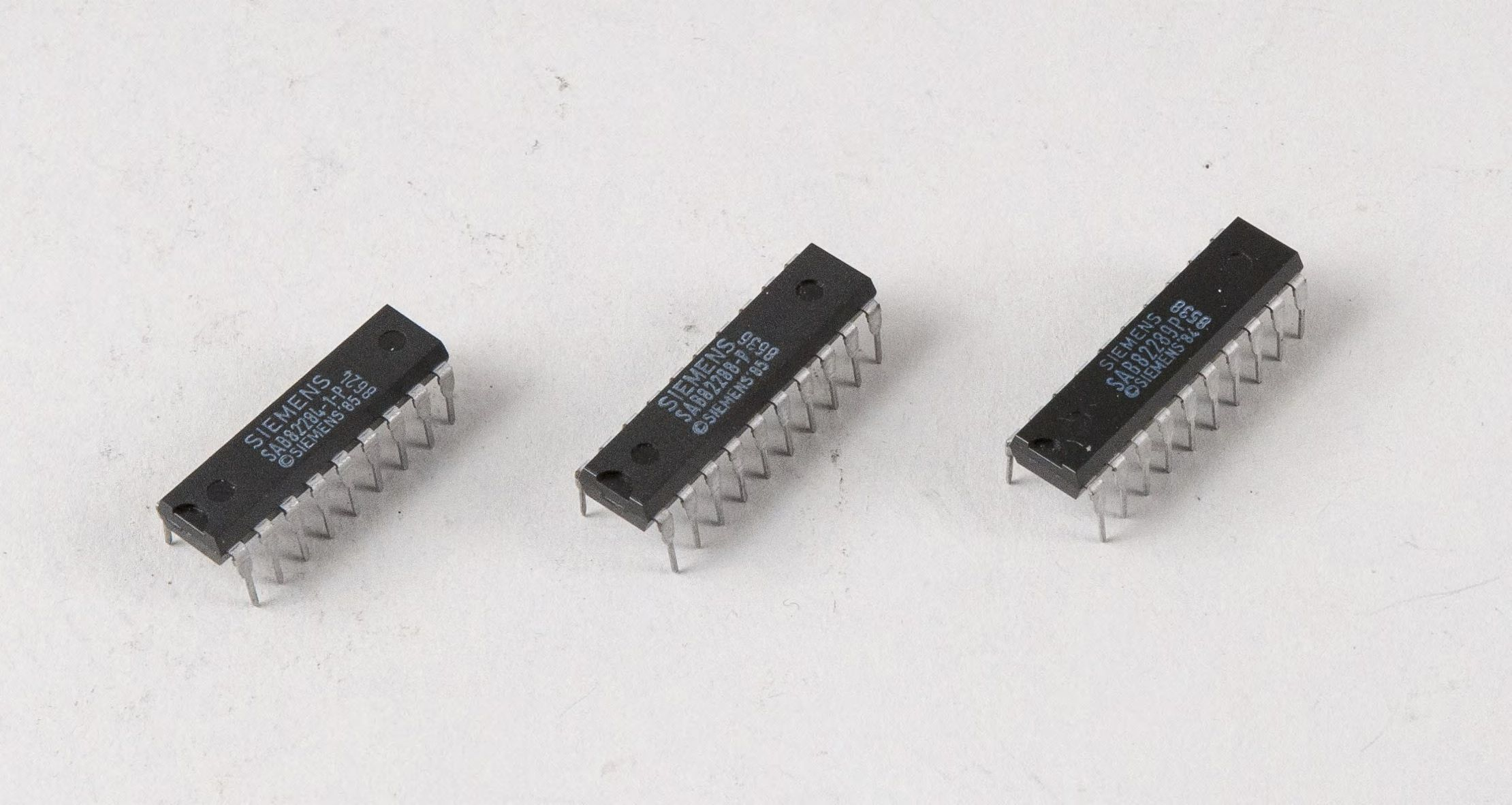
Siemens SAB82284, SAB82288, and SAB82289 (at Deutsches Museum)

This is a list of bus interface components that connect to an Intel 80286 microprocessor.

- 82230/82231 High Integration AT-Compatible Chip Set – The 82230 covers this combination of chips: 82C284 clock, 82288 bus controller, and dual 8259A interrupt controllers among other components. The 82231 covers this combination of chips: 8254 interrupt timer, 74LS612 memory mapper and dual 8237A DMA controller among other components. They were available by second-sourced with Zymos Corp. Both set are available US$60 for 10 MHz version and US$90 for 12 MHz version in quantities of 100.
- 82258 Advanced Direct Memory Access Controller – Transfer rate of 8MB per second, supports up to 32 subchannels, mask and compare, verify, translation, and assembly/disassembly operation that are being processed simultaneously. It also supports a 16MB addressing range. These were available for US$170 in quantities of 100.
- 82284 and 82C284 Clock Generator and Driver – Intel second sourced this 82284 version to Fujitsu Limited around 1985. The Intel branded chipset was available in 20-pin PLCC in sampling at first quarter 1986.
- 82288 Bus Controller, a bus controller supplied in 20-pin DIP package. It replaces 8288 used with earlier processors. Intel second sourced this chipset to Fujitsu Limited around 1985. The 20-pin PLCC version was available in sampling for first quarter of 1986.
- 82289 Arbiter

== See also ==
- U80601 – Almost identical copy of the 80286 manufactured 1989/1990 in East Germany. In the Soviet Union a clone of the 80286 was designated KR1847VM286 (Russian: КР1847ВМ286).
- iAPX, for the iAPX name
- LOADALL – Undocumented 80286/80386 instruction that could be used to gain access to all available memory in real mode.
- Windows 2.1, for Windows/286
