= HotJava =

Web browser

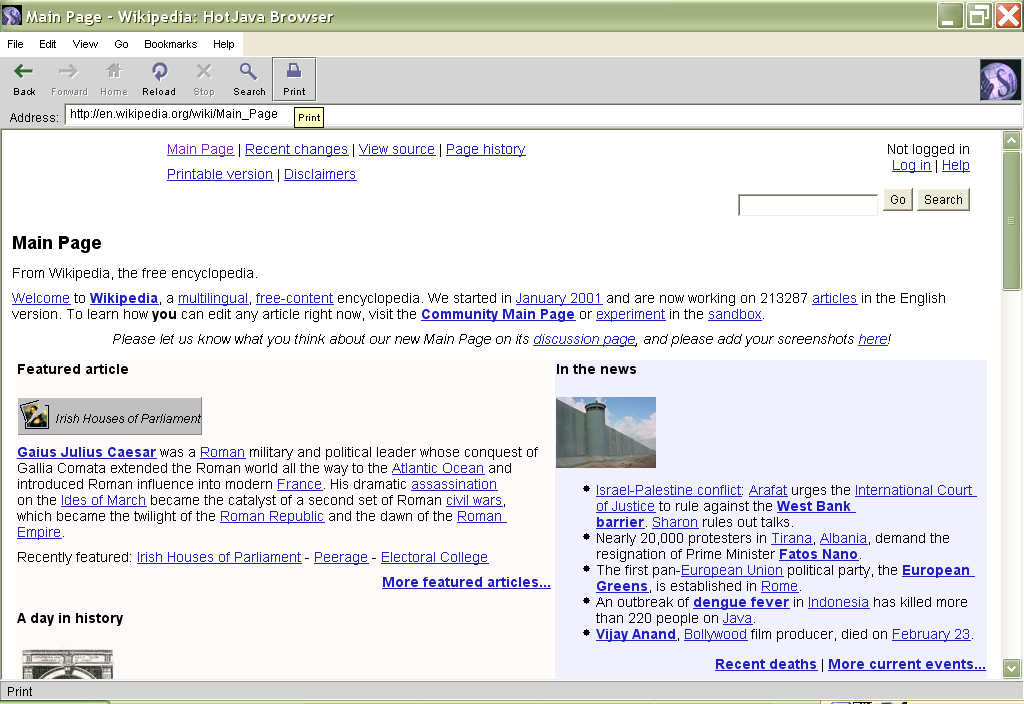
- HotJava 3.0 under Windows XP
- Developer(s): Sun Microsystems
- Initial release: March 24, 1997; 28 years ago
- Final release: Late 2004; 21 years ago v3.0
- Written in: Java
- Available in: English
- Type: Web browser
- Website: www.oracle.com/technetwork/java/index-136232.html

HotJava (later called HotJava Browser to distinguish it from HotJava Views) was a modular, extensible web browser from Sun Microsystems implemented in Java. It was the first browser to support Java applets, and was Sun's demonstration platform for the then-new technology. It has since been discontinued and is no longer supported. Furthermore, the Sun Download Center was taken down on July 31, 2011, and the download link on the official site points to a placeholder page saying so.

== Origins ==
In 1994, a team of Oak/Java developers started writing WebRunner, which was a clone of the web browser Mosaic. It was based on the Java programming language. The name ‘WebRunner’ was a tribute to the Blade Runner movie. The official Java name was adopted a year later in 1995 when Sun decided to make Oak public and integrate it with the web.

WebRunner's first public demonstration was given by John Gage and James Gosling at the Technology Entertainment Design Conference in Monterey, California in 1995. Renamed HotJava, it was officially announced in May the same year at the SunWorld conference.

The parser code was reused by the standard Java libraries.

== Usage ==
HotJava had somewhat limited functionality compared to other browsers of its time.

More critically, HotJava suffered from the inherent performance limitations of Java virtual machine implementations of the day (both in terms of processing speed and memory consumption) and hence was considerably sluggish.

== See also ==
- Comparison of web browsers
- List of web browsers
- Mozilla Grendel
