= Ultra 60 =

Computer workstation

- Manufacturer: Sun Microsystems
- Type: Workstation
- Released: February 1998
- Lifespan: 1998–2003
- Units sold: 500K+
- Media: CD, floppy
- Operating system: Solaris, Linux, BSD
- CPU: UltraSPARC II
- Memory: 2 GB
- Storage: SCSI SCA
- Display: VGA via 13W3
- Input: Serial, standard mini DIN-8 connector for Sun keyboard + Sun mouse
- Connectivity: 10/100 Ethernet
- Power: 110–240 V 50/60 Hz
- Dimensions: Height 45.0 cm (17.7 in.), Width 19.0 cm (7.5 in.), Depth 49.8 cm (19.6 in.)
- Weight: 22.65 kg (50 lb.)
- Predecessor: Ultra 1 (Single CPU); Ultra 2 (Dual CPU)
- Successor: Ultra 80

The Ultra 60 is a computer workstation in a tower enclosure from Sun Microsystems. The Ultra 60 was launched in November 1997 and shipped with Solaris 7. It was available in several specifications.

- Sun Ultra 60 workstation single CPU Model 1300 and dual CPU Model 2300, with Sun Creator3D graphics – began shipping February 1998. The last order date was August 4, 1999.
- Sun Ultra 60 workstation single CPU Model 1300 and dual CPU Model 2300, with Sun Elite3D graphics – began shipping March 1998.
- Sun Ultra 60 workstation single CPU Models 1360 and dual CPU 2360, with Sun Creator and Sun Elite3D graphics – began shipping April 1998.
- Sun Ultra 60 workstation single CPU Models 1450 and dual CPU 2450 – began shipping in May 1999.
- Sun Ultra 60 workstation models began shipping with 18-GB SCSI SCA, 10000-rpm internal drives in November 1999.

The Ultra 60 is similar to the higher-cost Ultra 80, but is somewhat smaller and supports fewer CPUs and less memory. The Ultra 60 may be rack-mounted using an optional kit (X9627A or 560–2548) although they were generally not rack-mounted, since the Ultra 60 was designed for use as a workstation rather than a server. The Enterprise 220R is an Ultra 60 motherboard in a specialized rackmount case with custom power supplies and other parts.

The Ultra 60 was replaced by the Ultra 45. The last order date for the Ultra 60 was July 2002, and the last model to be shipped was in 2003.

== Operating system ==
Although it shipped with Solaris 7, the Ultra 60 will run later versions of Solaris up to 10, as well as Linux and FreeBSD. The Ultra 60 cannot run Microsoft Windows directly, although an internal PCI card (SunPCi II pro and similar) from Sun could be fitted to allow the use of Windows.

== Hardware specifications and notes ==
=== CPU ===
The Ultra 60 came equipped with 1 or 2 CPUs. The CPUs run at 300, 360, or 450 MHz and have 16-KB data and 16-KB instruction cache on chip with a 2 MB or 4 MB external secondary cache (secondary cache size depends on CPU model).

=== Memory ===
The Ultra 60 uses 144-pin 5V 60ns DIMM memory modules of either 32, 64, or 128 MB which should be installed in sets of four identical DIMMs. There are 16 DIMM sockets, so it is possible to fit up to 2 GB with sixteen 128 MB modules. The memory bus is 576-bits wide; 512 bits are used for data and 64 bits for error correction. The specifications give the maximum throughput of 1.78 GB/s. Performance is improved if 2-way interleaving is used (giving 512 MB or 2 GB).

=== Internal storage ===
The Ultra 60 takes one or two 1" high SCA SCSI disk drives internally. It was sold with 18.2 GB or 36.4 GB disks, but can in practice use any SCA disk. The internal disks must be mounted in a carrier or spud-bracket (Sun part number 540-3024). The SCSI IDs of the internal disks are 0 and 3. These are set by the SCA backplane and can not be changed.

An optional 1.44 MB 3.5" MS-DOS/IBM PC compatible floppy drive can be fitted. An optional 644 MB SunCD 32X-speed, Photo CD compatible CD-ROM drive or an optional 10X DVD-ROM could be specified as well. Many Ultra 60s in current use will be fitted with a rewritable CD-ROM drive.

=== PCI and UPA slots ===
- http://www.sunshack.org/data/sh/2.1.8/infoserver.central/data/syshbk/Systems/U60/spec.html

==== PCI ====
Four full-size PCI slots compliant with PCI specification version 2.1:

- Three slots operating at 33 MHz, 32- or 64-bit data bus width, 5 volt
- One slot operating at 33 or 66 MHz, 32- or 64-bit data bus width, 3.3 volt

Some systems might be inoperable if a PCI 2.2 card is installed.

==== Video Card: Framebuffer / UPA ====
There are #2 UPA graphics slots running at 112 MHz supporting one Elite3D m3 and/or Elite3D m6 graphics options, or up to two Creator3D graphics options. The XVR-1000 graphics option is not officially supported but does work, under Solaris 9 or Solaris 10.

=== SCSI ===
The Sun Ultra 60 is fitted with a dual channel Ultra-3 SCSI controller. The speed is 40 MB/s. One controller (c0) is used for the internal disk(s) and CD-ROM, DVD-ROM and tape. The second channel (c1) is used for the external 68-pin Ultra wide SCSI connector on the rear of the Ultra 60.

=== Input and Output connectors ===
- Two RS-232C/RS-423 serial ports using DB-25 connectors
- A 2 MB/s Centronics-compatible parallel port using a DB-25 connector
- Standard mini DIN-8 connector for Sun keyboard / Sun mouse
- External Ultra Wide SCSI 68-pin connector
- 10/100 BASE-T Ethernet using the HME adapter
- IEC mains input connector

1 Gbit/s Ethernet can be used with the optional Sun X1141A Ethernet card. USB is not officially supported, but various USB boards for PCs have been known to work with Linux and Solaris.

== Power consumption ==
According to the hardware specifications on the Sun web site, the maximum power consumption is 380 W. The components list lists the power supply (Sun part number 300-1357) as a Sony 670 W 12A power supply. A well-fitted system (2x450 MHz, 2 GB memory, Elite3D graphics, one disk) draws about 200 watts when idle.

=== Reducing Power ===
Remove 2nd video card and 2nd CPU.

== Construction quality ==
The Ultra 60 is a well-built workstation. It does not use cheap mass-produced commodity PC parts like other Ultra workstations such as the Ultra 5 and Ultra 10. It is well-cooled, suffering none of the problems of overheating like Sun's previous quad processor machine, the SPARCstation 20.

== Support ==
The Ultra 60 was officially supported until October 2007.

== OS ==
- Solaris 7 through 10 http://www.oracle.com/webfolder/technetwork/hcl/data/systems/details/sun_microsystems/sol_10_03_05/1840.html
- http://www.debian.org/releases/stable/sparc/ch02s01.html.en
- http://www.openbsd.org/sparc64.html
- OpenSolaris
- "Guide to Ultra 60 OS support". Ars Technica. July 28, 2000.
