= Sun Ultra =

Workstations and servers introduced from 1995–2006

Ultra
- Developer: Sun Microsystems, Inc.
- Manufacturer: Sun Microsystems, Inc.
- Released: 1995; 31 years ago
- Lifespan: 1995–2001, 2005–2010
- Discontinued: 2010
- CPU: UltraSPARC; AMD Opteron; Intel Core 2; Intel Xeon

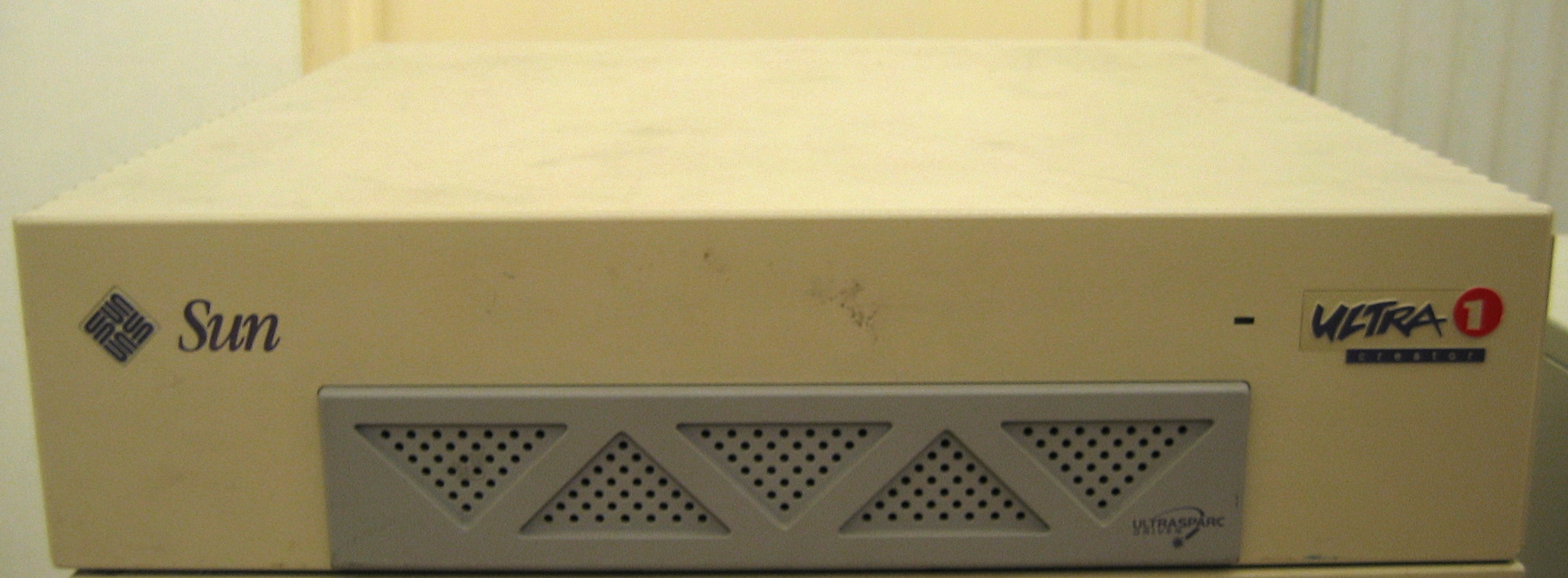
Sun Ultra 1 workstation

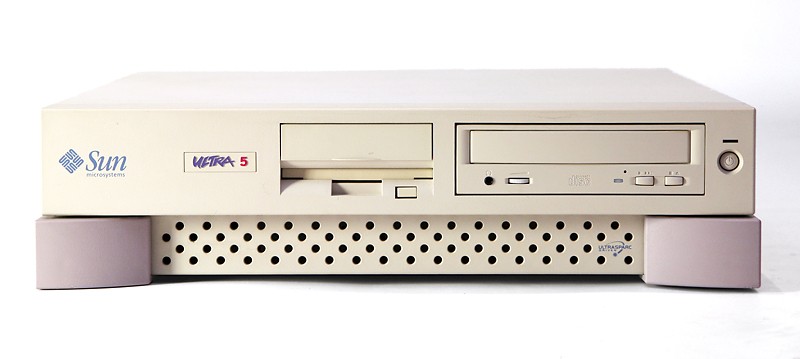
Sun Ultra 5 workstation

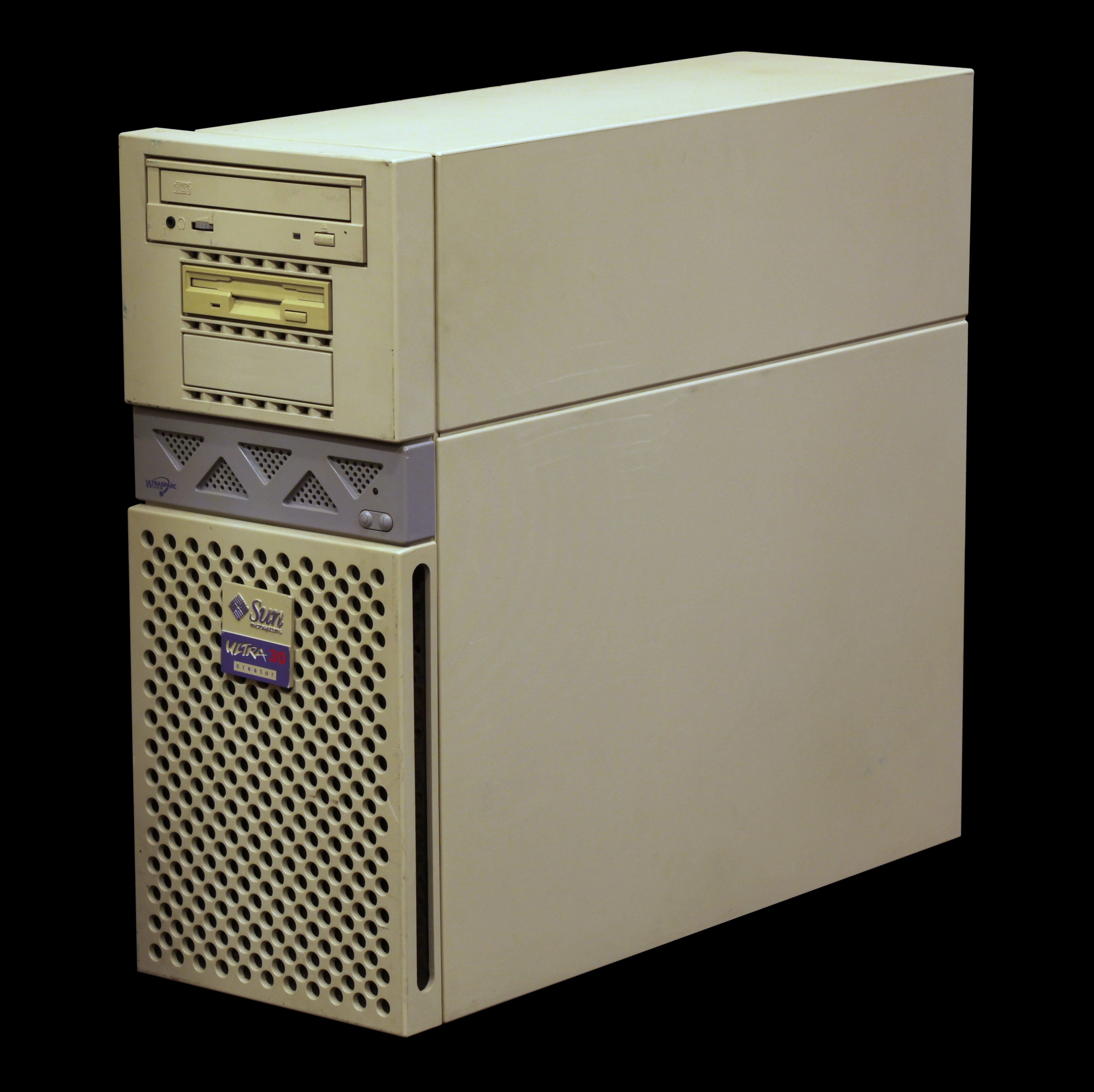
Sun Ultra 30 workstation

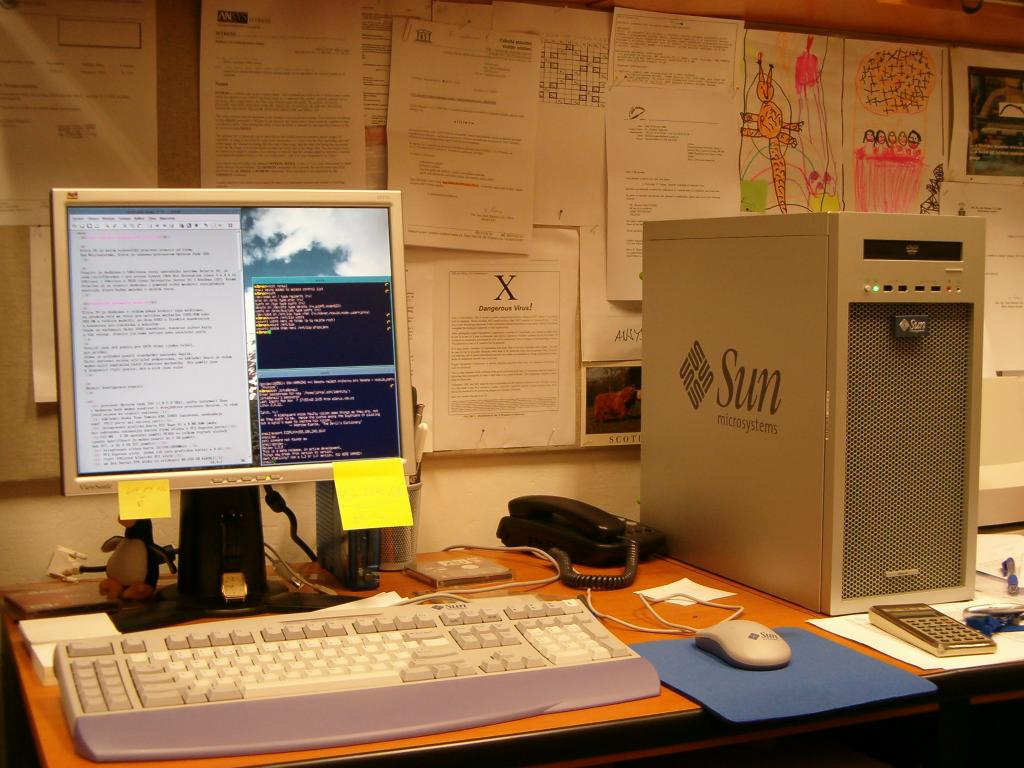
Sun Ultra 20 with an AMD Opteron processor

The Sun Ultra is a discontinued line of workstation and server computers developed and sold by Sun Microsystems, comprising two distinct generations. The original line was introduced in 1995 and discontinued in 2001. This generation was partially replaced by the Sun Blade in 2000 and that line was in itself replaced by the Sun Java Workstation—an AMD Opteron system—in 2004. In sync with the transition to x86-64-architecture processors, in 2005 the Ultra brand was later revived with the launch of the Ultra 20 and Ultra 40, albeit to some confusion, since they were no longer based on UltraSPARC processors.

== History ==
=== Original model ===
The original Ultra workstations and the Ultra Enterprise (later, "Sun Enterprise") servers were UltraSPARC-based systems produced from 1995 to 2001, replacing the earlier SPARCstation and SPARCcenter/SPARCserver series respectively. This introduced the 64-bit UltraSPARC processor and in later versions, lower-cost PC-derived technology, such as the PCI and ATA buses (the initial Ultra 1 and 2 models retained the SBus of their predecessors). The original Ultra range were sold during the dot-com boom, and became one of the biggest selling series of computers ever developed by Sun Microsystems, with many companies and organisations—including Sun itself—relying on Sun Ultra products for years after their successor products were released.

=== Brand revival ===
The Ultra brand was revived in 2005 with the launch of the Ultra 20 and Ultra 40 with x86-64-architecture.

x64-based Ultra systems remained in the Sun portfolio for five more years; the last one, the Intel Xeon-based Ultra 27, was retired in June 2010, thereby concluding the history of Sun as a workstation vendor.

=== Late SPARC models ===
The SPARC-based Ultra 3 Mobile Workstation laptop was released in 2005 as well, but it would prove to be a short-lived design and was retired the next year. Its release did not coincide with the rest of the line as most of the brand had already moved on to x86.

Additionally, new Ultra 25 and Ultra 45 desktop UltraSPARC IIIi-based systems were introduced in 2006.

In October 2008, Sun discontinued all these, effectively ending the production of SPARC architecture workstations.

The original Ultra/Enterprise series itself was later replaced by the Sun Blade workstation and Sun Fire server ranges.

== Sun Ultra models ==
=== Ultra workstations (1995–2001) ===
Model	Code	Codename	Processor(s)	Processor MHz	Expansion Buses/Slots	Introduced
Ultra 1	A11	Neutron	UltraSPARC I	143, 167	3 SBus; SCSI	Nov 1995
Ultra 1E	A12	Electron	UltraSPARC I	143, 167, 200	2 SBus, 1 UPA (Creator); SCSI	Nov 1995
Ultra 2	A14	Pulsar	Up to 2 UltraSPARC I or II	143, 167, 200, 300, 400	4 SBus, 1 UPA; SCSI	Nov 1995
Ultra 3000	A17	Duraflame	Up to 6 UltraSPARC I or II	167, 250, 336, 400		1996
Ultra 4000	A18	Campfire	Up to 14 UltraSPARC I or II	167, 250, 336, 400		1996
Ultra 30	A16	Quark	UltraSPARC II	250, 300	4 PCI, 2 UPA; SCSI	July 1997
Ultra 450	A20	Tazmo	Up to 4 UltraSPARC II	400		July 1997
Ultra 5	A21	Otter	UltraSPARC IIi	270, 333, 360, 400 (440 works, but is unsupported)	3 PCI; EIDE	Jan 1998
Ultra 10	A22	Sea Lion	UltraSPARC IIi	300, 333, 360, 440	4 PCI, 1 UPA; EIDE	Jan 1998
Ultra 60	A23	Deuterium	Up to 2 UltraSPARC II	300, 360 or 450 (400 works, but is unsupported)	4 PCI, 2 UPA; SCSI	Feb 1998
Ultra 80	A27	Quasar	Up to 4 UltraSPARC II	450		Nov 1999

=== Ultra Enterprise/Enterprise servers ===
==== Entry-level ====
Model	Code	Codename	Processor(s)	Processor MHz
UltraServer 1 Ultra Enterprise 1	A11	Neutron	UltraSPARC I	143 or 167
UltraServer 1E; Ultra Enterprise 1E	A12	Electron	UltraSPARC I	143, 167, 200
UltraServer 2 Ultra Enterprise 2	A14	Pulsar	Up to two UltraSPARC I or II	143, 167, 200, 300
Ultra Enterprise 150	E150	Dublin	UltraSPARC I	167
Enterprise Ultra 5S	A21	Otter	UltraSPARC IIi	270, 333, 360, 400
Enterprise Ultra 10S	A22	Sea Lion	UltraSPARC IIi	300, 333, 360, 440
Enterprise 450	A25	Tazmax	Up to 4 UltraSPARC II	250, 300, 400, 480
Enterprise 250	A26	Javelin	Up to two UltraSPARC II	250, 300, 400
Enterprise 420R	A33	Quahog	Up to 4 UltraSPARC II	450
Enterprise 220R	A34	Razor	Up to two UltraSPARC II	360, 450

Note: the Enterprise 220R is an Ultra 60 motherboard in a rack-mountable server chassis with hot-swappable power supplies. Similarly, the Enterprise 420R is an Ultra 80 motherboard in a server chassis.

==== Mid-range and high-end ====
Model	Code	Codename	Processor(s)	Processor MHz
Ultra Enterprise 3000	E3000	Duraflame	Up to six UltraSPARC I or II	167, 250, 336, 400, 464*
Ultra Enterprise 4000	E4000	Campfire	Up to 14 UltraSPARC I or II	167, 250, 336, 400, 464*
Ultra Enterprise 5000	E5000	Campfire	Up to 14 UltraSPARC I or II	167, 250, 336, 400, 464*
Ultra Enterprise 6000	E6000	Sunfire	Up to 30 UltraSPARC I or II	167, 250, 336, 400, 464*
Enterprise 3500	E3500	Duraflame+	Up to eight UltraSPARC I or II	167, 250, 336, 400, 464
Enterprise 4500	E4500	Campfire+	Up to 14 UltraSPARC I or II	167, 250, 336, 400, 464
Enterprise 5500	E5500	Campfire+	Up to 14 UltraSPARC I or II	167, 250, 336, 400, 464
Enterprise 6500	E6500	Sunfire+	Up to 30 UltraSPARC I or II	167, 250, 336, 400, 464
Enterprise 10000	E10000	Starfire	4 to 64 UltraSPARC II	250, 336, 400, 466

- = available as upgrade option only

=== Ultra workstations (2005–2010) ===
In the intervening time gap, Sun workstations were named Sun Blade and Sun Java Workstation.

==== UltraSPARC ====
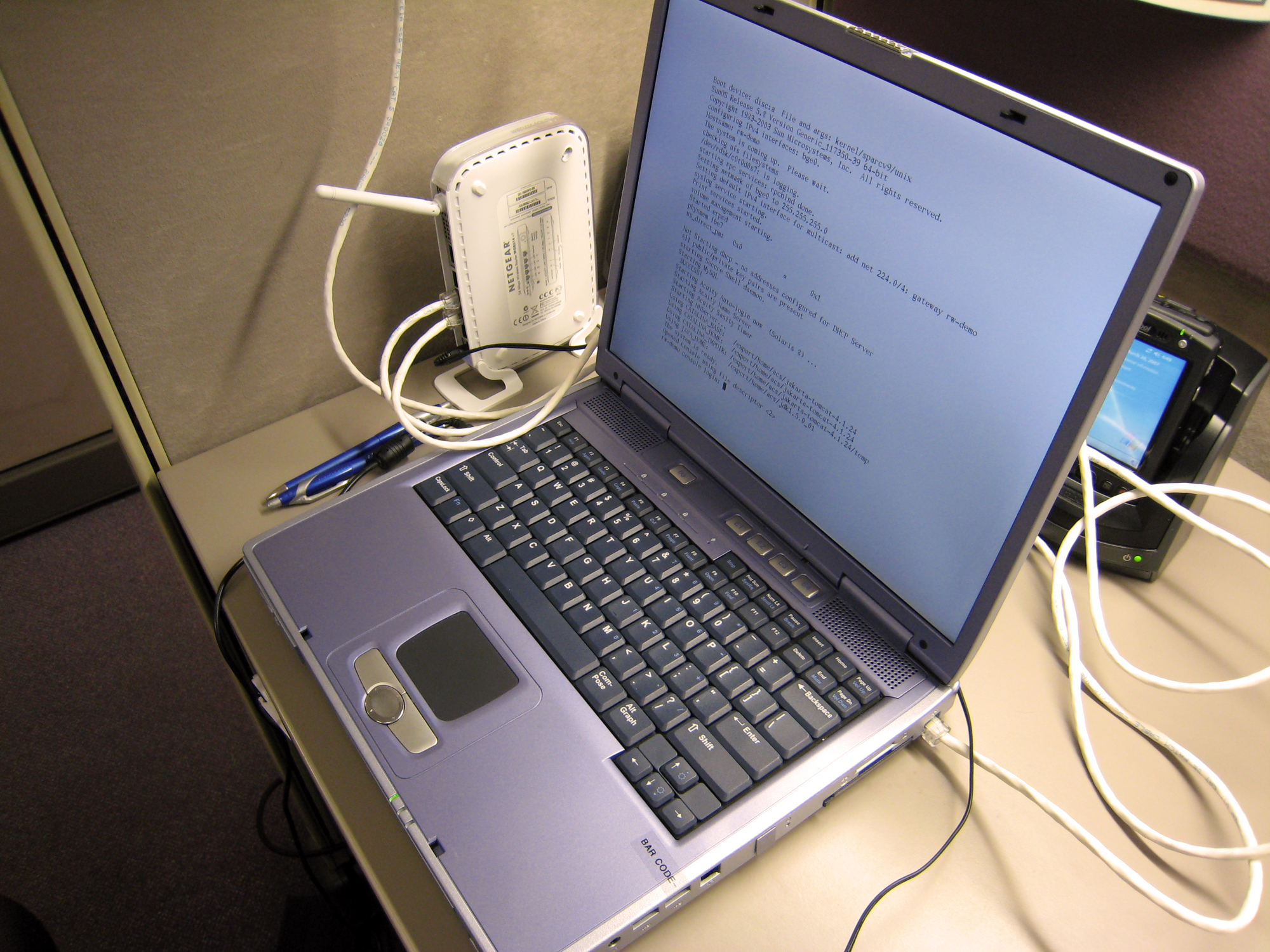
Sun Ultra 3 laptop

The A60 Ultra 3 mobile workstation rebadged the Tadpole SPARCle (550 and 650 MHz) and Viper (1.2 GHz) laptops. The A61 Ultra 3 was physically different and was based on the Naturetech 888P (550/650 MHz) and Mesostation 999 (1.28 GHz). The two lines are unrelated systems otherwise.

Model	Code	Codename	Processor(s)	Processor freq.	Maximum RAM
Laptop
Ultra 3	A60/A61	?	UltraSPARC IIi or IIIi	550 MHz, 650 MHz, 1.28 GHz	2 GB
Desktop
Ultra 45	A70	Chicago	Up to two UltraSPARC IIIi	1.6 GHz	16 GB
Ultra 25	A89	South Side	UltraSPARC IIIi	1.34 GHz	8 GB

==== x86 ====
Model	Code	Codename	Processor(s)	Processor freq.	Maximum RAM
Ultra 20	A63	Marrakesh	AMD Opteron Single Core 144, 148, 152 or Dual Core 180	1.8, 2.2, 2.6, 3.0 GHz	4 GB
Ultra 40	A71	Sirius	Up to two AMD Opteron Dual Core 246, 254 or 280	2.0, 2.4, 2.8 GHz	32 GB (w/2 CPUs)
Ultra 40 M2	A83	Stuttgart	Up to two AMD Opteron Dual Core 2000 Series	1.8, 2.2, 2.6, 2.8, 3.0 GHz	32 GB (w/2 CPUs)
Ultra 20 M2	A88	Munich	AMD Opteron Dual Core 1200 series	1.8, 2.2, 2.6, 2.8, 3.0 GHz	8 GB
Ultra 24	B21	Ursa	Intel Core 2 Duo/Quad/Quad Extreme	2.0, 2.2, 2.4, 2.66, 3.0, 3.16 GHz	8 GB
Ultra 27	B27	Volans	Intel Xeon Quad Core 3500 series	2.66, 2.93, 3.20 GHz	12 GB
