= Ultra 80 =

Computer workstation

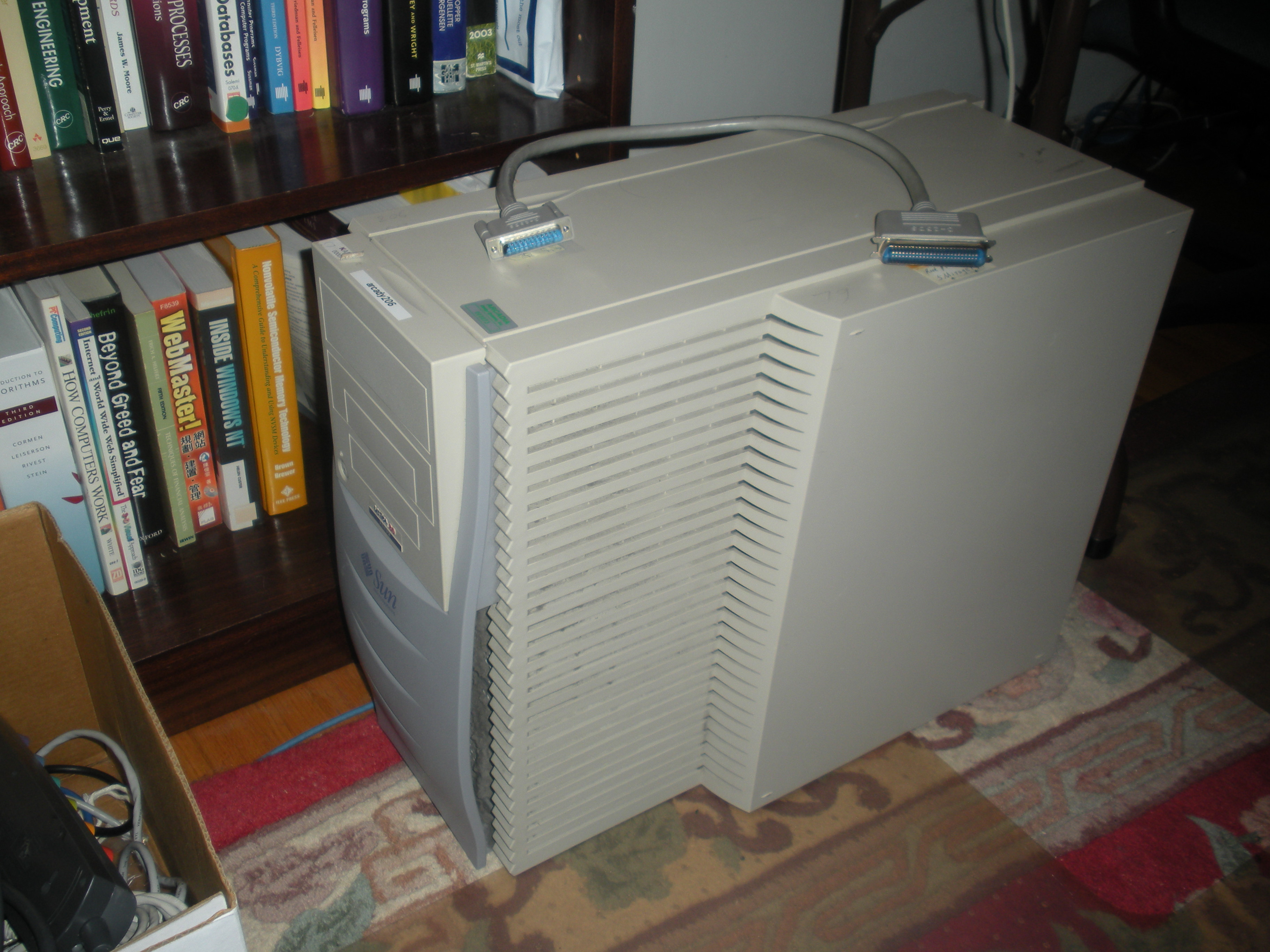
A Sun Ultra 80 workstation

The Sun Microsystems Ultra 80 is a computer workstation that shipped from November 1999 to 2002.

Its enclosure is a fairly large (445 mm (17.5 in) high, 255 mm (10.0 in) wide and 602 mm (23.7 in) deep) and heavy (29.5 kg (65 lb)) tower design. At launch, it shipped with Solaris 7, and was available in a variety of different configurations, with one (model 1450), two (model 2450) or four (model 4450) 64-bit UltraSPARC II CPUs and up to 4 GB of RAM. When released, the Ultra 80 was Sun's highest performance workstation.

The Ultra 80 is similar to the lower-cost Sun Ultra 60, but is somewhat larger and supports more CPUs and memory. Although it was designed as a workstation rather than a server, it may be rack mounted using an optional kit. The Enterprise 420R is a server product based on the Ultra 80 motherboard in a specialized rack-mountable chassis, with custom power supplies and other parts more appropriate for server applications.

The last order date for the Ultra 80 was July 2002 and the last model stopped shipping in October 2002. The later Ultra 45, introduced in 2006, supports a maximum of two CPUs, rather than the four of the Ultra 80.

== Operating system ==
The Ultra 80 shipped with Solaris 7 Update 8/99, and is capable running later versions of Solaris through Solaris 10 (Oracle Solaris 11 dropped support for UltraSPARC II, III and IV processors), as well as Linux and NetBSD. The Ultra 80 cannot run Microsoft Windows directly, although an internal PCI card (SunPCi II pro and similar) from Sun could be fitted to allow the use of Windows.

== Hardware specifications and notes ==
Full specifications can be found on the Sun web site.

=== CPU ===
Although only sold with either one, two, or four CPUs, the use of three CPUs is a supported configuration. The CPUs run at 450 MHz and have 16-KB data and 16-KB instruction cache on chip with a secondary 4-MB external cache. The X1195A is the part number of one of the CPUs. Each CPU has an integrated floating point processor.

=== Memory ===
The Ultra 80 uses 144-pin 5V 60-ns DIMM memory modules of either 64 or 256 MB, which should be installed in sets of four identical DIMMs. There are 16 DIMM sockets, so it is possible to fit up to 4 GB with sixteen 256 MB modules. The memory bus is 576 bits wide; 512 bits are used for data and 64 bits for error correction. The specifications list a maximum throughput of 1.78-GB/s. Performance is improved if 2-way interleaving is used (giving 512 MB or 2 GB) and maximum performance is achieved with 4-way interleaving, in which case all 16 memory slots would be used, providing the machine with 1 GB or 4 GB of RAM.

Half of the Ultra 80's memory must be fitted on the motherboard and the other half on a memory riser board. Care is needed in handling the memory riser board, as the connector is not designed for repeated use. It must be tightened using a torque wrench supplied with the Ultra 80, as detailed in the service manual.

=== Internal storage ===
The Ultra 80 takes one or two 1" high SCA SCSI disk drives internally. It was sold with 18.2-GB or 36.4-GB disks, but can in practice use any SCA disk. The internal disks must be mounted in a carrier or spud-bracket (Sun part number 540-3024). The SCSI IDs of the internal disks are 0 and 3. These are set by the SCA backplane and cannot be changed.

An optional 1.44 MB 3.5" MS-DOS/IBM-compatible floppy drive can be fitted. The Ultra 80 could be purchased new with an optional 12/24 GB (native/compressed) DDS-3 tape drive, but will work with a DDS-4 drive, and probably larger tape drives. An optional 644 MB SunCD 32X-speed, Photo CD compatible CD-ROM drive or an optional 10X DVD-ROM could be specified as well. 3rd-party rewritable CD-ROM drives could also be used.

=== PCI and UPA slots ===
The Ultra 80 has four full-size slots compliant with PCI specification version 2.1:

- One PCI slot operating at 33- or 66 MHz, 32- or 64-bit data bus width, 3.3 volt
- Two PCI slots operating at 33 MHz, 32- or 64-bit data bus width, 5 volt
- One PCI slot operating at 33 MHz, 32-bit data bus width, 5 volt.

Some systems might be inoperable if a PCI 2.2 card is installed.

=== Framebuffer ===
There are two UPA graphics slots running at 112 MHz, supporting one or two Elite3D m3 and/or Elite3D m6 graphics options. The popular Creator3D framebuffer is not supported, but will usually (but not always) work. Some Ultra 80s were sold with the PGX32 framebuffer, even though its low performance made it more appropriate for use in server rather than workstation applications. Although not sold with the Ultra 80s, the later XVR series framebuffers also work, as do the Expert3D series.

=== SCSI ===
The Sun Ultra 80 is fitted with a dual-channel Ultra-3 SCSI controller. The speed is 40 MB/s. One controller (c0) is used for the internal disk(s) and CD-ROM, DVD-ROM and tape. The second channel (c1) is used for the external 68-pin Ultra wide SCSI connector on the rear of the Ultra 80.

=== Input and output connectors ===
The Sun Ultra 80 has

- Two RS-232C/RS-423 serial ports using 25-pin D connectors
- A 2 MB/s Centronics-compatible parallel port using a 25-pin D connector
- Standard mini DIN-8 connector for Sun keyboard/ Sun mouse
- External ultra wide 68-pin SCSI connector
- 10/100 BASE-T Ethernet using the HME adapter
- IEC mains input connector

1 Gbit/s Ethernet can be used with the optional Sun X1141A Ethernet card. USB is not officially supported, but various USB boards for PCs have been known to work with Linux and Solaris.

== Power consumption ==
Maximum power consumption is documented as 380 watts; the components list specifies a Sony 670 watt, 12 amp power supply (Sun part number 300-1357).

== Construction quality ==
The Ultra 80 was a high end workstation, as it does not use cheaper, mass-produced commodity computer parts as other Ultra workstations (such as the Ultra 5 and Ultra 10) do. It was designed to address the overheating problems the SPARCstation 20, Sun Microsystem's previous four-processor workstation.

== Support ==
Support for the Ultra 80 ended in October 2007. In addition to official support, knowledgeable people, (often Sun employees), are regular visitors to the comp.unix.solaris, comp.sys.sun.hardware and comp.sys.sun.admin Usenet newsgroups.

== Benchmarks ==
The Sun Ultra 80 Workstation - Just The Facts guide, gives the following data for the well known SPECint 95 and SPECfp 95 benchmarks, although a search of the web site of the Standard Performance Evaluation Corporation (SPEC) does not show these figures. SPEC ceased use of the benchmark before the Ultra 80 was released, so the last results submitted to their web site are in the 3rd quarter of 1998, a little over a year before the Ultra 80 was released in November 1999.

Benchmarks for Sun Ultra 80 (from Sun, not SPEC)
	Model 1450 (one CPU)	Model 2450 (two CPUs)	Model 4450 (four CPUs)
SPECint 95	19.7	19.7	19.7
SPECfp 95	27.9	36.1	44.6

A number of results for the less-commonly-used SPECfp_rate95 and SPECfp_rate_base95 benchmarks can be found on the SPEC web site and are given below.

Benchmarks for Sun Ultra 80 take from the SPEC web site
	Model 1450 (one CPU)	Model 2450 (two CPUs)	Model 4450 (four CPUs)
SPECfp_rate95	233	455	799
SPECfp_rate_base95	211	401	690
