= Ultra 30 =

Family of Sun Microsystems workstations

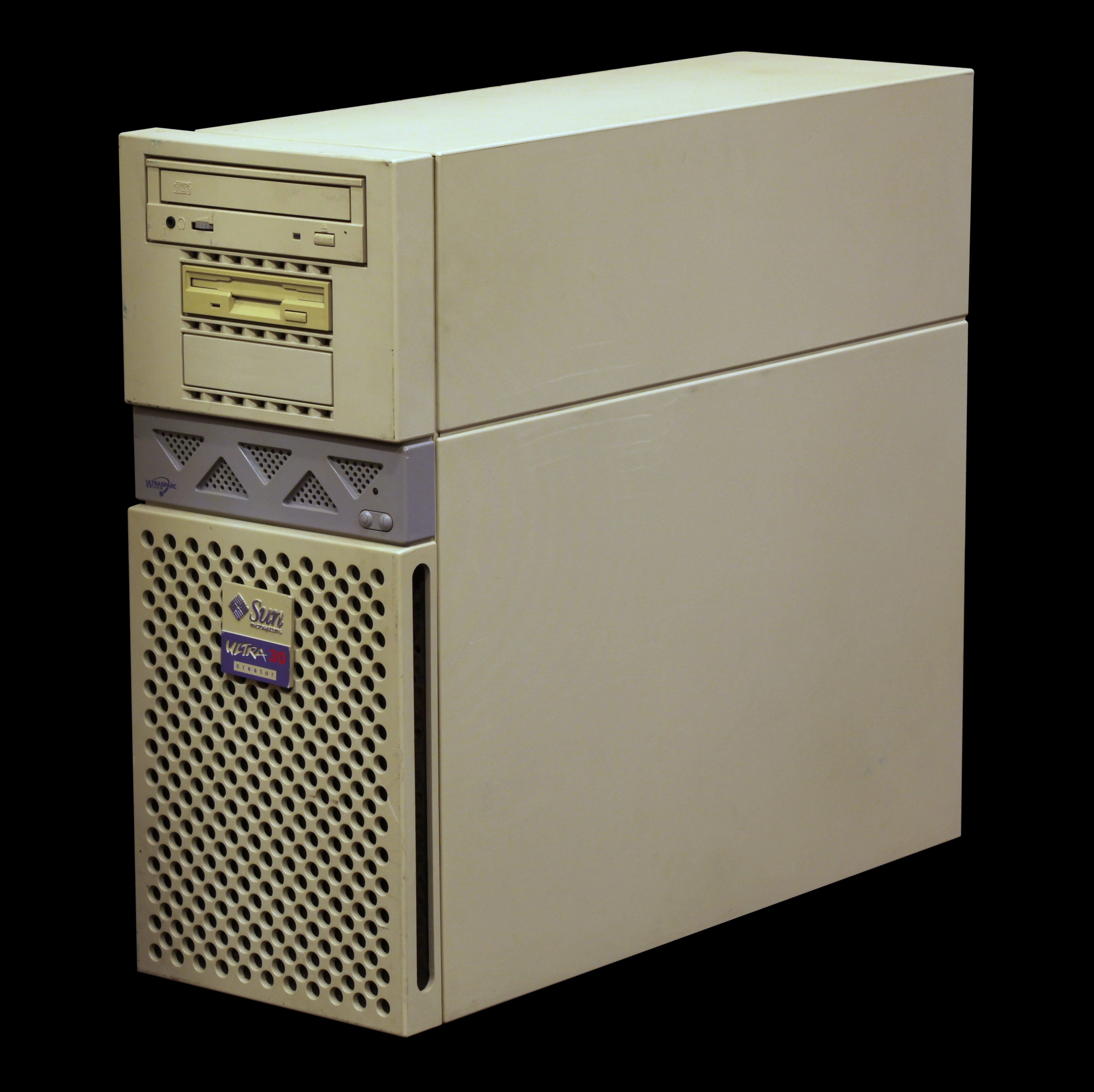
Sun Ultra 30

The Ultra 30 (code-named Quark) is a family of Sun Microsystems workstations based on the UltraSPARC II microprocessor. It was the first Sun workstation to use the industry-standard PCI bus instead of Sun's proprietary SBus, and is a member of the Sun Ultra series. It launched in July 1997 and shipped with Solaris 2.6. The Ultra 30 reached its end-of-life in May 1999.

The Ultra 30 ran off of a single UltraSPARC II CPU; however, it was only compatible with two models: the 250 MHz module (501-4857) and the 300 MHz module (501-4849). The system supports two Ultra SCSI hard drives and 16 DIMM slots for a maximum of 2 GB memory capacity. The machine also featured four full-sized PCI slots, two UPA slots, two RS-232C/RS-423 serial ports, and 100BASE-T Fast Ethernet.

== Compatible Sun Part Numbers ==
Item Number	Description
Boot PROM
525-1669	N/A
Communication
370-2811	FDDI/P SAS 1.0
370-2812	FDDI/P DAS 1.0
375-0001	Token Ring Interface (TRI/P) 1.0
370-2728	High Speed Serial Interface (HSI/P) 1.0
370-2810	Serial Asynchronous Interface (SAI/P) 1.0
501-3028	SunATM-155/MFiber 3.0
501-3027	SunATM-155/UTP 3.0
501-3029	SunATM-622/MFiber 3.0
CPU Module
501-4857	250 MHz UltraSPARC II Module
501-4849	300 MHz UltraSPARC II Module
Disks
370-2367	Seagate ST34371WC (4.2 GB, 7,200 RPM)
370-2809	Quantum VK45J05 (4.2 GB, 7,200 RPM)
370-3412	Fujitsu MAB3045SC (4.2 GB, 7,200 RPM)
370-3403	IBM DDRS-34560 (4.2 GB, 7,200 RPM)
370-3413	Fujitsu MAB3091SC (9.1 GB, 7,200 RPM)
370-3404	IBM DDRS-39130 (9.1 GB, 7,200 RPM)
370-3595	Seagate ST39173WC (9.1 GB, 7,200 RPM)
390-0004	Fujitsu MAE3091LC (9.1 GB, 7200 RPM)
390-0007	IBM DNES-309170 (9.1 GB, 7200 RPM)
370-3649	Seagate ST39102LC (9.1 GB, 10,000 RPM)
390-0005	Fujitsu MAG3091LC (9.1 GB, 10,000 RPM)
390-0009	Seagate ST39103LC (9.1 GB, 10,000 RPM)
390-0037	Seagate ST39204LC (9.1 GB, 10,000 RPM)
370-2369	Seagate ST19171WC (9.1 GB, 7,200 RPM)
370-2365	Seagate ST32171WC (2.1 GB, 7,200 RPM)
370-2808	Quantum VK22J05 (2.1 GB, 7,200 RPM)
Ethernet
501-5019	SunFastEthernet (FE/P)
501-5406	Sun Quad FastEthernet (QFE/P)
375-0002	Gigabit Ethernet 1.0 (GBE/P)
501-4373	Gigabit Ethernet 2.0 (GBE/P)
501-5426	Gigabit Ethernet FC-AL/P
Graphics
370-3278	SunVideo Plus
501-4174	Creator Series 2 (FFB2)
501-4172	Creator3D Series 2 (FFB2)
370-2256	PGX 8-Bit Color Frame Buffer
501-4789	Creator Series 3 (FFB2+)
501-5690	Creator3D Series 3 (FFB2+)
501-5484	Elite3D-m3
540-3902	Elite3D-m6
370-3753	PGX32 8/24-Bit Color Frame Buffer
IDPROM
525-1430	48T59 NVRAM
595-1865	SunButtons 32-key function I/O device
595-1737	SunDials 8-dial interactive graphics I/O for 3-D
370-1414	SunMicrophone
370-1678	SunMicrophone II
Memory
501-2479	32 MB (2 × 16 MB DIMM)
501-2622	64 MB (2 × 32 MB DIMM)
501-2480	128 MB (2 × 64 MB DIMM)
501-3136	256 MB (2 × 128 MB DIMM)
PSU
300-1343	Zytec EP071295-C 350 Watt Power Supply
300-1325	Lucent LP300A 300 Watt Power Supply (Pre-FCS)
300-1337	Lucent LP300A 300 Watt Power Supply (A116)
SCSI
501-5656	Single-Ended Ultra/Wide SCSI (SunSwift PCI)
501-5727	Dual FastEthernet + Dual SCSI PCI Adapter
375-0005	Dual Single-Ended Ultra/Wide SCSI (PCI)
375-0006	Dual Differential Ultra/Wide SCSI (PCI)
540-3016	Floppy and SCSI Adapter (Drive Bay FRU)
330-2148	Floppy and SCSI Adapter (Drive Bay)
530-2322	Floppy and SCSI Adapter (Cable Assembly)
System Board
501-3139	0MB FRU
