= Sun Java Workstation =

Sun Java Workstation was a line of computer workstations sold by Sun Microsystems from 2004 to 2006, based on the AMD Opteron microprocessor family. The range supplanted the earlier Sun Blade workstation line. These were the first x86-architecture workstations Sun had produced, other than the short-lived Sun386i in the late 1980s.

Supported operating systems were Solaris, Red Hat Enterprise Linux WS or SUSE Linux Enterprise Server 9. The Java Workstation name alluded to the workstations being intended to run Sun's Java Desktop System, a GNOME-based desktop environment.

The Java Workstation series was replaced by Ultra 20 and Ultra 40 workstations from 2005 onwards.

== Models ==
| Model | Code | Codename | Processor(s) | Processor speed (GHz) |
|---|---|---|---|---|
| Java Workstation W1100z | A58 | Metropolis1P | One Opteron 144, 146, 148 or 150 | 1.8, 2.0, 2.2 or 2.4 |
| Java Workstation W2100z | A59 | Metropolis2P | Two Opteron 244, 246, 248, 250 or 252 | 1.8, 2.0, 2.2, 2.4 or 2.6 |
