= UltraPort =

UltraPort may refer to:

- ThinkPad UltraPort - the IBM nonstandard USB connection
- Ultra Port Architecture - the Sun Microsystems proprietary bus
