= RDI PowerLite =

Series of SPARC-based laptop computers

The RDI PowerLite is a series of SPARC-based laptops and mobile workstations marketed by RDI Computer Corporation.

PowerLite models were all based on Sun's sun4m architecture, and were fully compatible with all operating systems and software developed for them. All models had support for two 2.5" SCSI hard drives and one floppy drive or PCMCIA adapter, or three 2.5" SCSI hard drives. 104-key keyboards and trackballs were also included. In addition, there were docking stations available, with SBus slots and additional 3.5" hard drive bays.

A ruggedized model was also released, the RUGGEDIZED PowerLite, with one floppy drive and PCMCIA standard, and an optional CD-ROM or DAT drive.

Model	CPU	CPU MHz	Framebuffer	LCD options	Base RAM	Max RAM	Weight	Similar Sun model
PowerLite 50	microSPARC	50 MHz	cgthree	10.4", 640x480, 256 color, 65,535 color palette 10.4", 1024x768, 256 color, 512 color palette	16 MiB	80 MiB	8.5 pounds (3.9 kg)	SPARCclassic
PowerLite 85	microSPARC II	85 MHz	Turbo GX	10.4", 640x480, 256 color, 262,144 color palette 10.4", 800x600, 262,144 colors 10.4", 1024x768, 256 color, 512 color palette	32 MiB	128 MiB	8.5 pounds (3.9 kg), later 7.5 pounds (3.4 kg)	SPARCstation 5
PowerLite 110	microSPARC II	110 MHz	Turbo GX	10.4", 640x480, 256 color, 262,144 color palette 10.4", 800x600, 262,144 colors 10.4", 1024x768, 256 color, 512 color palette 12.1", 1024x768, 4,096 colors	32 MiB	128 MiB	8.5 pounds (3.9 kg), later 7.5 pounds (3.4 kg)	SPARCstation 5
RUGGEDIZED PowerLite	microSPARC II	110 MHz	Turbo GX	10.4", 640x480 10.4", 1024x768	32 MiB	128 MiB	30 pounds (14 kg)	SPARCstation 5
PowerLite Turbo 170	TurboSPARC	170 MHz	Turbo GX	12.1", 800x600, 262,144 colors 12.1", 1024x768	32 MiB	256 MiB	7.5 pounds (3.4 kg)	SPARCstation 5
