= Sun Blade (workstation) =

Sun Microsystems UltraSPARC-based computers

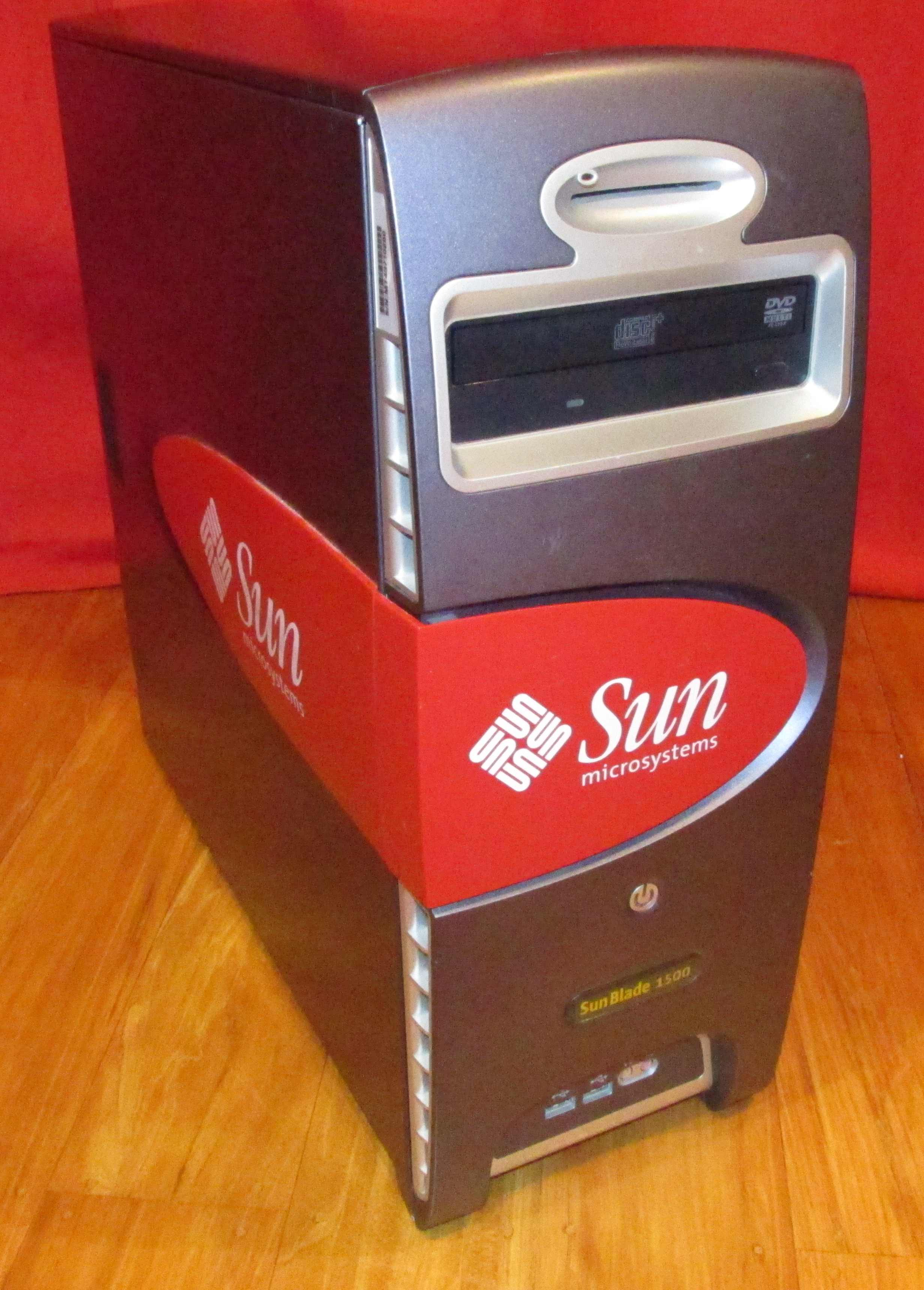
Sun Blade 1500 workstation

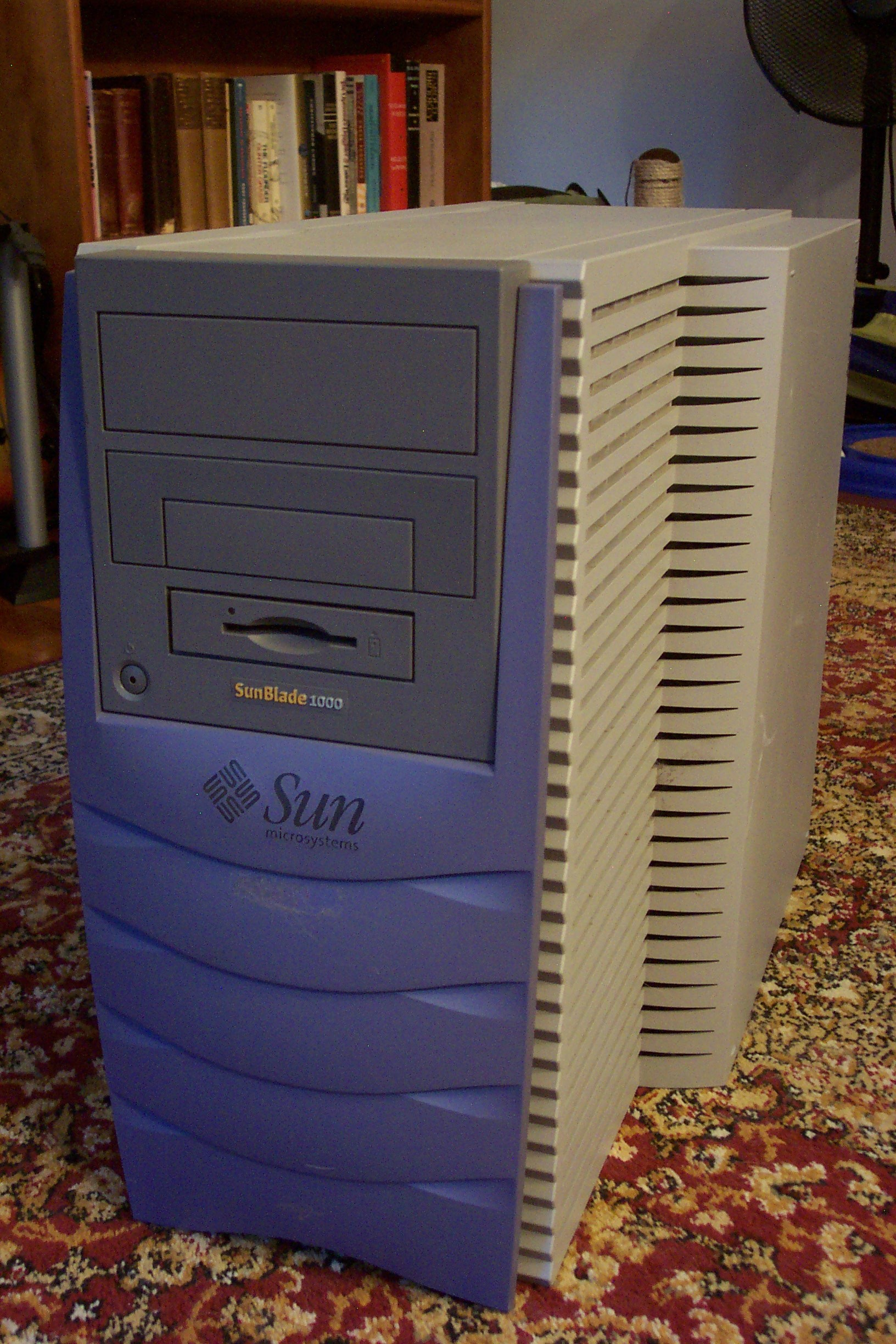
Sun Blade 1000 workstation

The Sun Blade series is a computer workstation line based on the UltraSPARC microprocessor family, developed and sold by Sun Microsystems from 2000 to 2006. The range replaced the earlier Sun Ultra workstation series.

The Sun Blade 1000, introduced in October 2000, was the first system to use Fireplane as the interconnect between its single or dual processors and the I/O subsystem, a few months ahead of its use in the new Sun Fire server product line.

The 1500/2500 series came in two variants, the earlier "red" series, and the later "silver" series. The "silver" series were enhanced versions of the "red" series - a faster CPU being the key differentiator.

The Sun Blade series was supplanted by the Sun Java Workstation line in 2004.

The product line's name was not a reference to "blade server" systems, a term not yet in common use in 2000. In 2006, Sun did introduce an unrelated "Sun Blade" blade server product line.

== Models ==
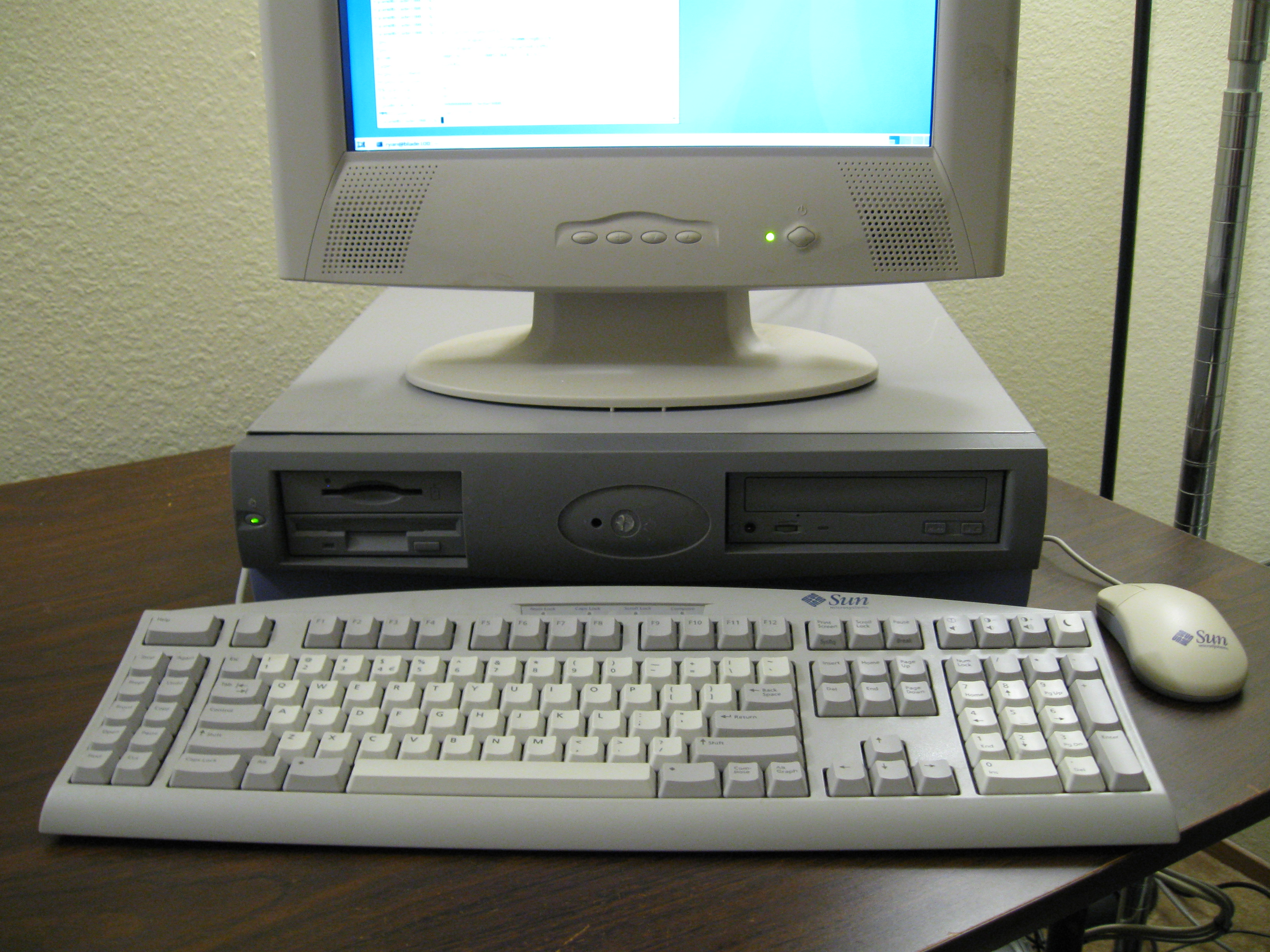
Sun Blade 100 workstation (desktop form factor), missing its front badge

Model	Code	Codename	Processor(s)	Processor MHz	Solaris supported
1000	A28	Excalibur	Up to two UltraSPARC III or UltraSPARC III Cu	600, 750, 900 (1200 works, but is unsupported)	8 10/00 to 11 Express
2000	A29		Up to two UltraSPARC III Cu	900, 1015, 1050, 1200	8 2/02 to 11 Express
100	A36	Grover	UltraSPARC IIe	500	8 10/00 to 10 1/13
2500	A39	Enchilada	Up to two UltraSPARC IIIi	1280	8 5/03 to 10 1/13
2500 Silver	A39	Enchilada	Up to two UltraSPARC IIIi	1600	8 2/04 to 10 1/13
150	A41	Grover Plus	UltraSPARC IIi	550, 650	8 2/02 to 10 1/13
1500	A43	Taco	UltraSPARC IIIi	1062	8 5/03 to 11 Express
1500 Silver	A43	Taco	UltraSPARC IIIi	1503	8 2/04 to 11 Express
