= Ultra 5/10 =

Ultra 5 and Ultra 10 Workstations, Sun Microsystems, 1998-2002

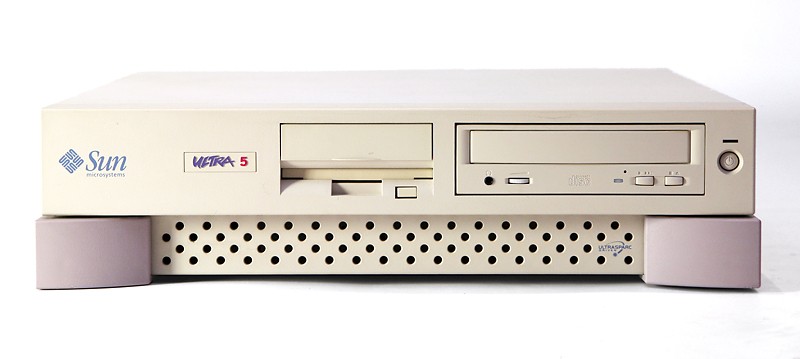
Ultra 5

The Ultra 5 (code-named Otter) and Ultra 10 (code-named Sea Lion) are 64-bit Sun Microsystems workstations based on the UltraSPARC IIi microprocessor available since January 1998 and last shipped in November 2002. They were introduced as the Darwin line of workstations.

== Specifications ==
These systems are notable for being the first in the Sun workstation line to introduce various commodity PC compatible hardware components such as ATA hard disks with CMD640 PCI EIDE controller and an ATI Rage PRO video chip.

The Ultra 5 came in a "pizzabox" style case with a 270, 333, 360, or 400 MHz UltraSPARC IIi CPU and supported an official maximum of 512 MB Buffered EDO ECC RAM in four 50ns 168-pin DIMM slots. Larger DIMMs which provide 1024 MB in the Ultra 5 work, although this requires special low height DIMMs or leaving the floppy drive out. It included a single EIDE Hard Disk Drive of between 4 and 20 GB, a CD-ROM drive, three 32-bit 33 MHz PCI slots (two full-size, one short), PGX24 graphics (HD15), a parallel printer port (DB25), two serial ports (DB25 and DE9), an Ethernet port (10BASE-T/100BASE-TX) and headphone, line-in, line-out and microphone 3.5-mm jacks.

The Ultra 10 came in a mid-tower case with a 300, 333, 360, or 440-MHz 64-bit UltraSPARC CPU. It doubled the supported RAM to a maximum of 1024 MB in four DIMM slots and added room for a second ATA hard disk, a fourth PCI card, and an UPA graphics card such as the Creator, Creator3D or Elite3D.

=== Keyboard ===
The Sun Type 6 keyboard came in two variants, one with Mini-DIN, one with USB connectors. The top edge of the keyboard is rounded. The keyboard has a special "diamond" key (called Meta key) placed next to the space key. This key comes from Lisp machines and is meant to be used with the Emacs editor. It also has 3 keys for regulating volume control or screen brightness and a power key in the upper top corner.

It came with a purple plastic wrist rest.

The keyboard has 4 LEDs on the top (rather than incorporated into the key cap): Num Lock, Caps Lock, Scroll Lock, Compose.

== See also ==
- Sun Ultra 1
- Sun Ultra series
