= SunPCi =

Series of single-board computers

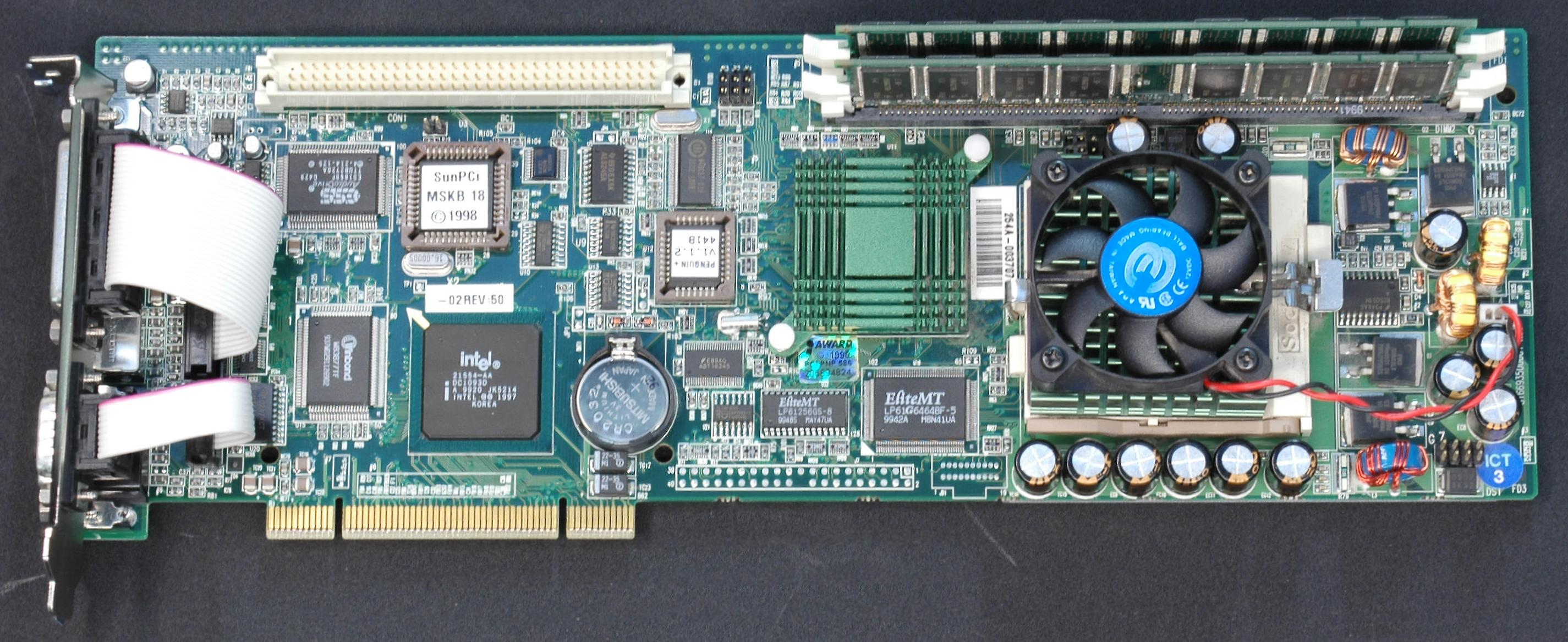
SunPCi card with 400 MHz processor

SunPCi is a series of single-board computers with a connector that effectively allows a PC motherboard to be fitted in Sun Microsystems SPARC-based workstations based on the PCI architecture adding the capability for the workstation to act as a 'IBM PC compatible' computer. The Sun PCi cards included an x86 processor, RAM, expansion ports, and an onboard graphics controller, allowing a complete Wintel operating environment (Note: Sun microsystems tended to use the term operating environment where many would simply use operating system, there may be some specific reasoning behind the different terminology.) on a Solaris system. The SunPCi software running on Solaris emulates the disk drives that contain the PC filesystem. The PC software running on the embedded hardware is displayed in an X window on the host desktop; there is also a connector on the edge of the board that can optionally be used to connect a PC monitor.

== History ==
The product arose from the issue of people who were working on a Unix workstation that was typically not Intel-based being sent a file from a Microsoft Windows based PC and being unable to handle the file. Sun termed this problem interoperability. By the year 2000 solutions to the problem such as emulators were available but their performance at the time was quite problematic. With Sun workstations adopting the PCI hardware bus standard this became possible.

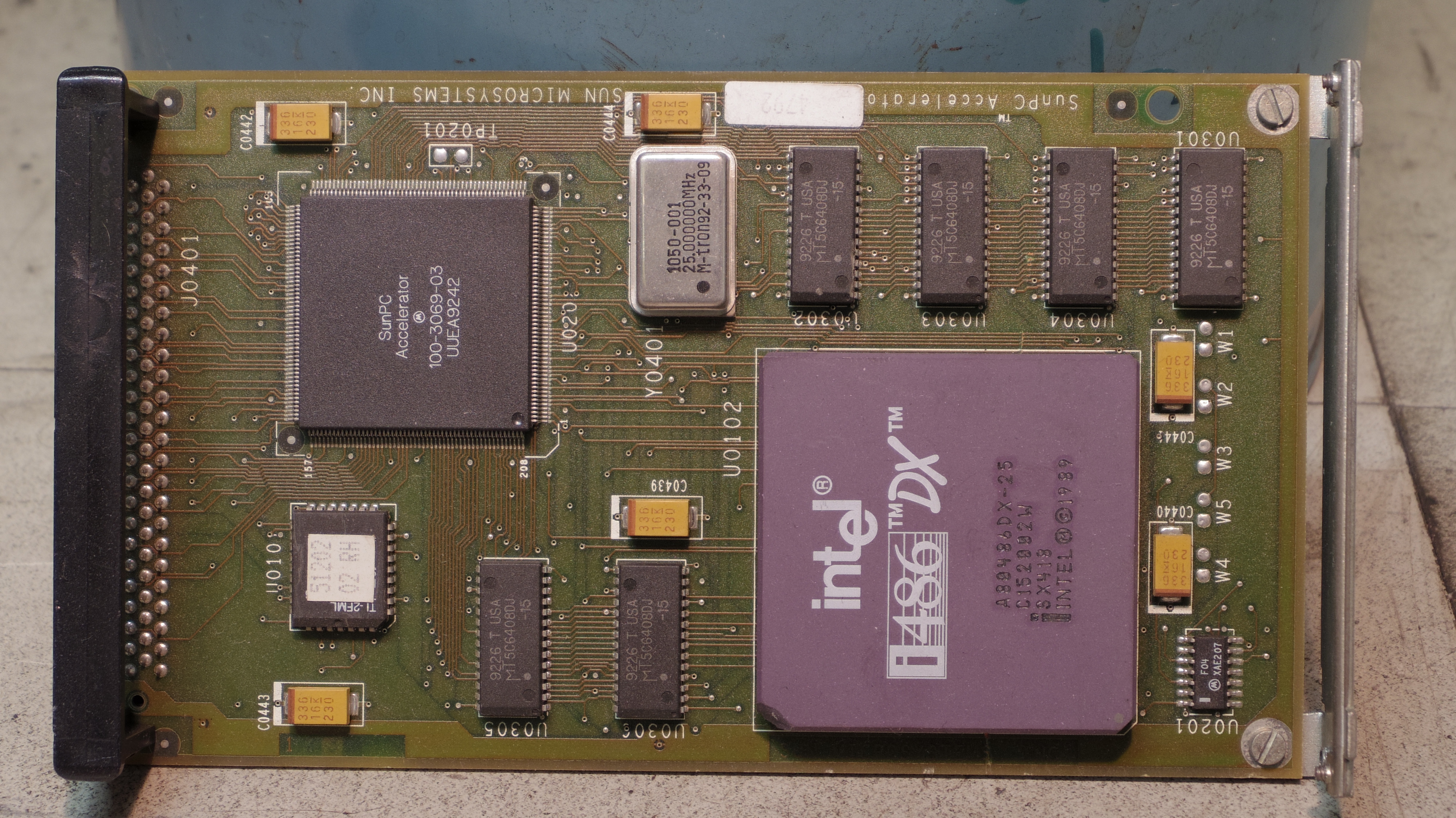
SunPC Accelerator DX

These cards were the successor to the earlier SunPC cards that had been available for Sun SBus or VME systems. Prior to this a software only application binary interface and DOS emulator called Wabi was used. SunPC was offered as a replacement software emulator that could be used to run more advanced applications, with higher performance, by adding an X86 hardware accelerator. In 1992 the SunPC Accelerator SX (16 MHz 486SX) or SunPC Accelerator DX (25 MHz 486DX) were available for SBus workstations, though the SunPC program emulates the PC memory with or without the accelerator present. An accelerator card is needed for software that requires 80386 or 80486 hardware, such as Windows 3.11 running in enhanced mode or Windows 95; without this hardware SunPC runs in software-only mode which emulates an 80286. In 1997 a 133 MHz 5x86 AMD SBus co-processor was available.

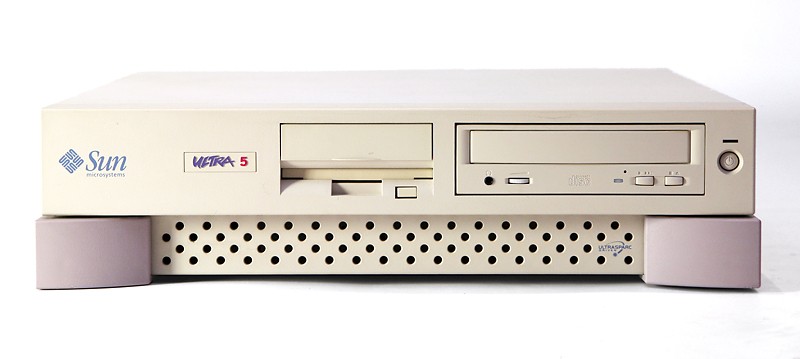
The SunPCi was originally used in workstations such as the Ultra 5

The Ultra 5 workstation with an optional SunPCi for running Windows 95 or NT was announced in November 1998. The next year Ultra 5 systems including a SunPCi with a 300 MHz AMD K6-2 processor and 64 to 256 MB RAM were available. Windows applications running on this system were measured to be 40% slower than a desktop PC with a 300 MHz Pentium II, but the card was cheaper than purchasing a new PC. Following an in-depth review in 1999 with an original 300MHz 64mb memory SunPCi card, Kevin Railsback in InfoWorld magazine noted the price was competitive and the performance was suitable for business applications especially when using the output attached to the SunPCi to a dedicated monitor. The downsides were that a separate license was required for the Windows 95 operating system, MS-DOS disk drivers performed slowly and DirectX was not available unless using the separate dedicated monitor. The 600 MHz SunPCi II was introduced in 2000. With the release of version 2.2 of the SunPCi II software in 2001 it was possible to have more than one accelerator card in a workstation or entry-level Sun Enterprise server. By 2005 the SunPCi IIIpro was available for workstations such as the Sun Blade 150.

== Hardware and software ==
=== Hardware ===
According to Sun documentation the "... coprocessor card is not just PC-compatible, it is an actual PC that is constructed from real PC components and follows the de facto and emerging PC hardware design standards."

Model	CPU type	Clock speed	Part number
SunPCi	AMD K6-2	300 MHz	375-0075
SunPCi	AMD K6-2	400 MHz	375-0095
SunPCi II	Intel Celeron	600 MHz	375-0131
SunPCi IIpro	Intel Celeron	733 MHz	375-3051
SunPCi III	AMD Athlon XP	1.4 GHz	375-3116
SunPCi IIIpro		1.6 GHz	375-3203

=== Software ===
The SunPCi I (Note: Later documentation retroactively refers to the first generation "SunPCi" as "SunPCi I.") coprocessor with version 1.3 software, the final release for SunPCi I hardware, is compatible with Solaris 2.5.1, 2.6, 7 or 8 running on the host. Solaris 9 support was included starting with the SunPCi II hardware and version 2.3.1 software. The SunPCi III is supported on Solaris 10 with patches, but SunPCi II is not.

The first version of the SunPCi card was intended to run Windows 95 or NT. The cards were not limited to just "officially" supported operating systems; according to Sun "Because the card is a PC system, future Microsoft Windows operating systems should also be compatible." Later, the following Windows and Linux operating systems were officially supported by Sun on the SunPCi IIIpro:

- Microsoft Windows 2000 Professional
- Microsoft Windows 2000 Server
- Microsoft Windows XP
- Microsoft Windows Server 2003
- Red Hat 9 Personal/Professional
- Red Hat Enterprise Linux 3 WS/ES

Some people have also claimed to successfully run some other operating systems on particular SunPCi cards, including NetBSD and Debian Linux

== See also ==
- Sun386i, Sun Microsystems Intel based workstation product
