= Tadpole Computer =

Computer manufacturing company

- Founded: 1994; 32 years ago
- Defunct: 2005
- Fate: Acquired by General Dynamics
- Headquarters: Cupertino, United States
- Products: Laptops, servers, workstations
- Website: www.tadpolecomputer.com

Tadpole Computer became a manufacturer of UNIX workstations, thick and thin client laptops, and lightweight servers, having started as a manufacturer of single-board UNIX computers.

== History ==
Tadpole was founded in the late 1980s, originally based in Cambridge, England. Initial funding was based on the credit card of the then-MD. The main manufacturing was carried out in Cambridge in a small advanced facility on the Cambridge Science Park with re-assembly of the laptops occurring in the Austin, TX, offices.

In 1998, Tadpole acquired RDI Computer Corporation of Carlsbad, California, who produced the competing Britelite and Powerlite portable SPARC-based systems, for $6 million.

Tadpole was later acquired by defense contractor General Dynamics, in April 2005.

Production continued until March 2013 but since then, they no longer sell any systems; and support for their products was provided by Flextronics. Flextronics discontinued Tadpole support around 2019. Vector Data, a Tadpole OEM, still provides legacy Tadpole systems and support.

An anonymous US intelligence officer had stated to Reuters in 2013 that a decade earlier the US secretly created a company reselling laptops from Tadpole Computer to Asian governments. The reseller added secret software that allowed intelligence analysts to access the machines remotely.

== Products ==
Tadpole laptops used a variety of architectures, such as SPARC, Alpha, PowerPC and x86. Although very expensive, these classic Tadpoles won favour as a method to show corporation's proprietary software (IBM/HP/DEC) on a self-contained portable device on a client site in the days before remote connectivity.

=== SPARC ===
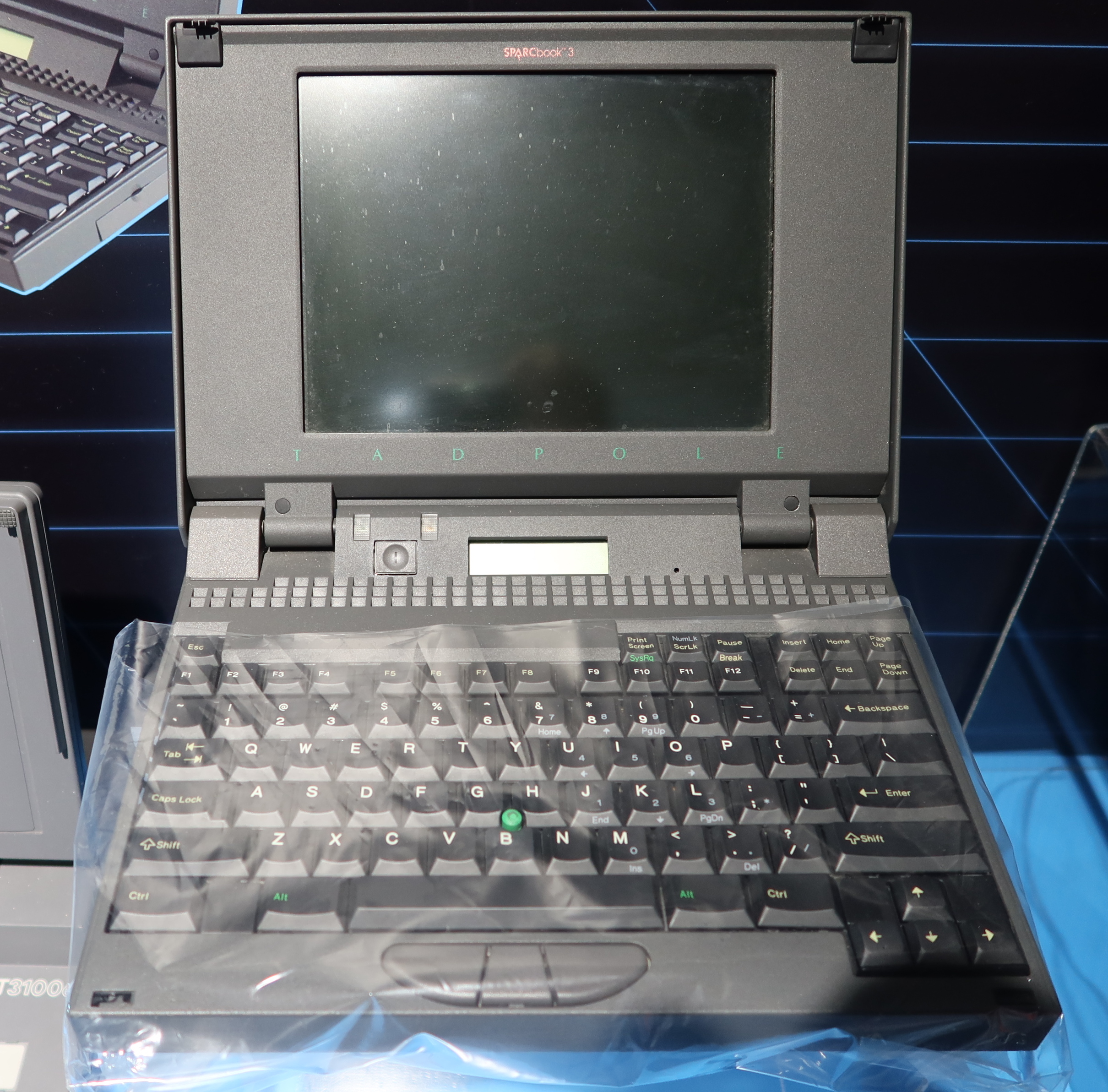
SPARCbook 3 in Computer History Museum

The original SPARCbook 1 was introduced in 1992 with 8–32 MB RAM and a 25 MHz processor. It was followed by several further SPARCbooks, UltraSPARCbooks (branded as Ultrabooks) – and the Voyager IIi. These all ran the SunOS or Solaris operating systems. In 2004, Tadpole released the Viper laptop.

The SPARCLE was based on a 500-600 MHz UltraSPARC IIe or 1 GHz UltraSPARC IIIi.

=== DEC Alpha ===
Demo of the Tadpole ALPHAbook 1 at VMworld 2011

An Alpha-based laptop, the ALPHAbook 1, was announced on 4 December 1995 and became available in 1996. The Alphabook 1 was manufactured in Cambridge, England. It used an Alpha 21066A microprocessor specified for a maximum clock frequency of 233 MHz. The laptop used the OpenVMS operating system.

=== IBM PowerPC ===
A PowerPC-based laptop was also produced – the IBM RISC System/6000 N40 Notebook Workstation, powered by a 50 MHz PowerPC 601 and with between 16 and 64MB RAM – and designed to run IBM AIX.

=== x86 ===
Tadpole also produced a range of x86-based notebook computers, including the Tadpole P1000, and the TALIN laptops with SUSE Linux, or optionally Microsoft Windows.

== See also ==
- Military computers
- RDI PowerLite
- Toughbook, Panasonic's rugged portable computers
