= Marc Tremblay =

Engineer at Microsoft

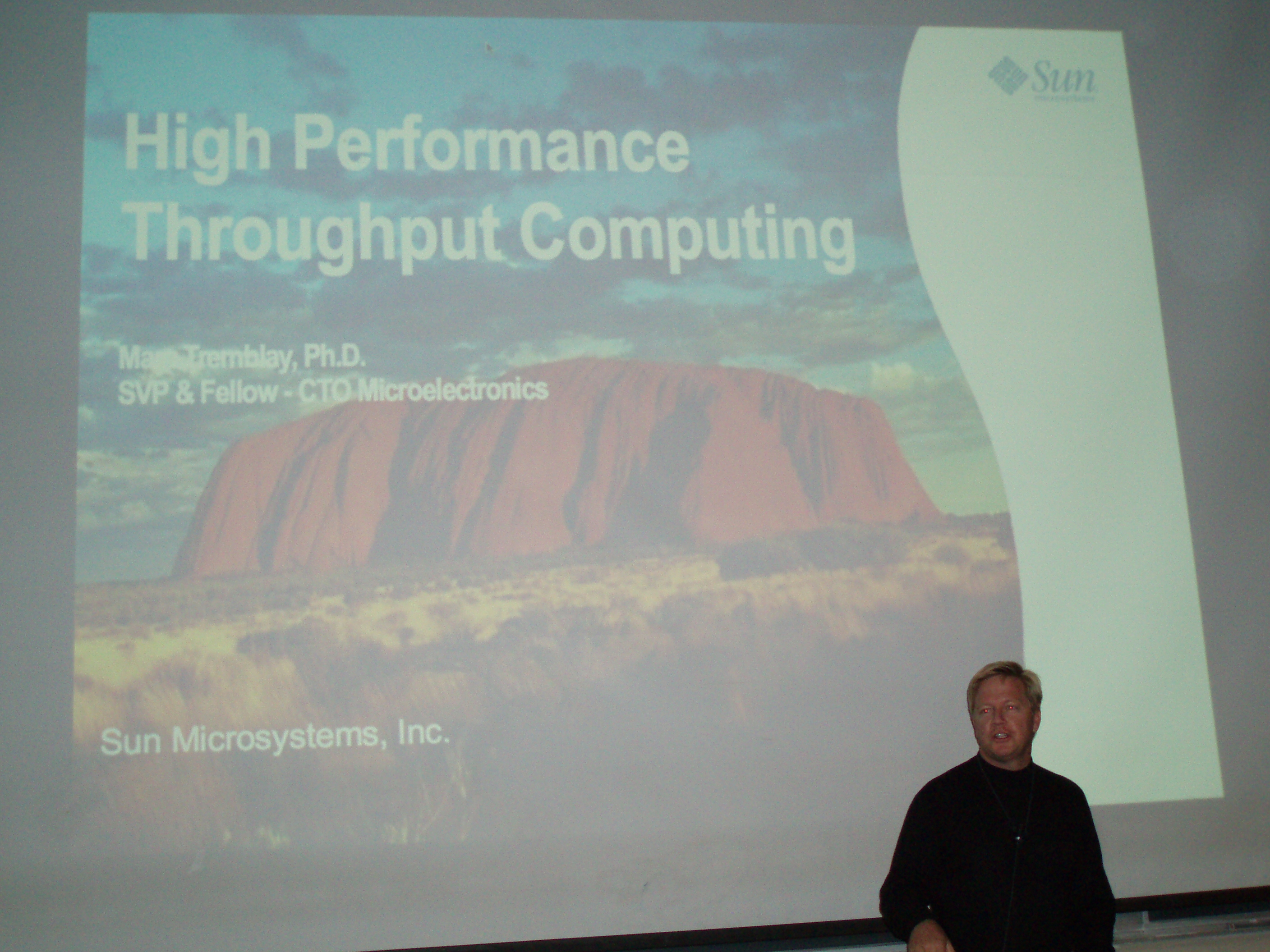
Tremblay giving a talk on high performance throughput computing in 2008

Marc Tremblay is a distinguished engineer at Microsoft. Prior to joining Microsoft in April 2009, he was senior vice president and chief technology officer of the microelectronics business unit at Sun Microsystems. He was instrumental in the design of various microprocessors at Sun, including the UltraSPARC, UltraSPARC II, MAJC, UltraSPARC T1, and the cancelled Rock processor. In the process, he was awarded more patents than any other Sun employee.

== Career ==
Tremblay worked at Sun Microsystems for 18 years. In 2009, he joined Microsoft's strategic software/silicon architecture group, led by chief research and strategy officer, Craig Mundie. A team worked under Tremblay developing software semiconductor technologies. The group, known as SiArch, works on green, adaptive and parallel computing.

== Education ==
He received his bachelor's degree from Laval University in Canada, and both his M.S. (1985) and Ph.D. (1991) degrees from UCLA.
