= Ultra 24 =

Series of computer workstation

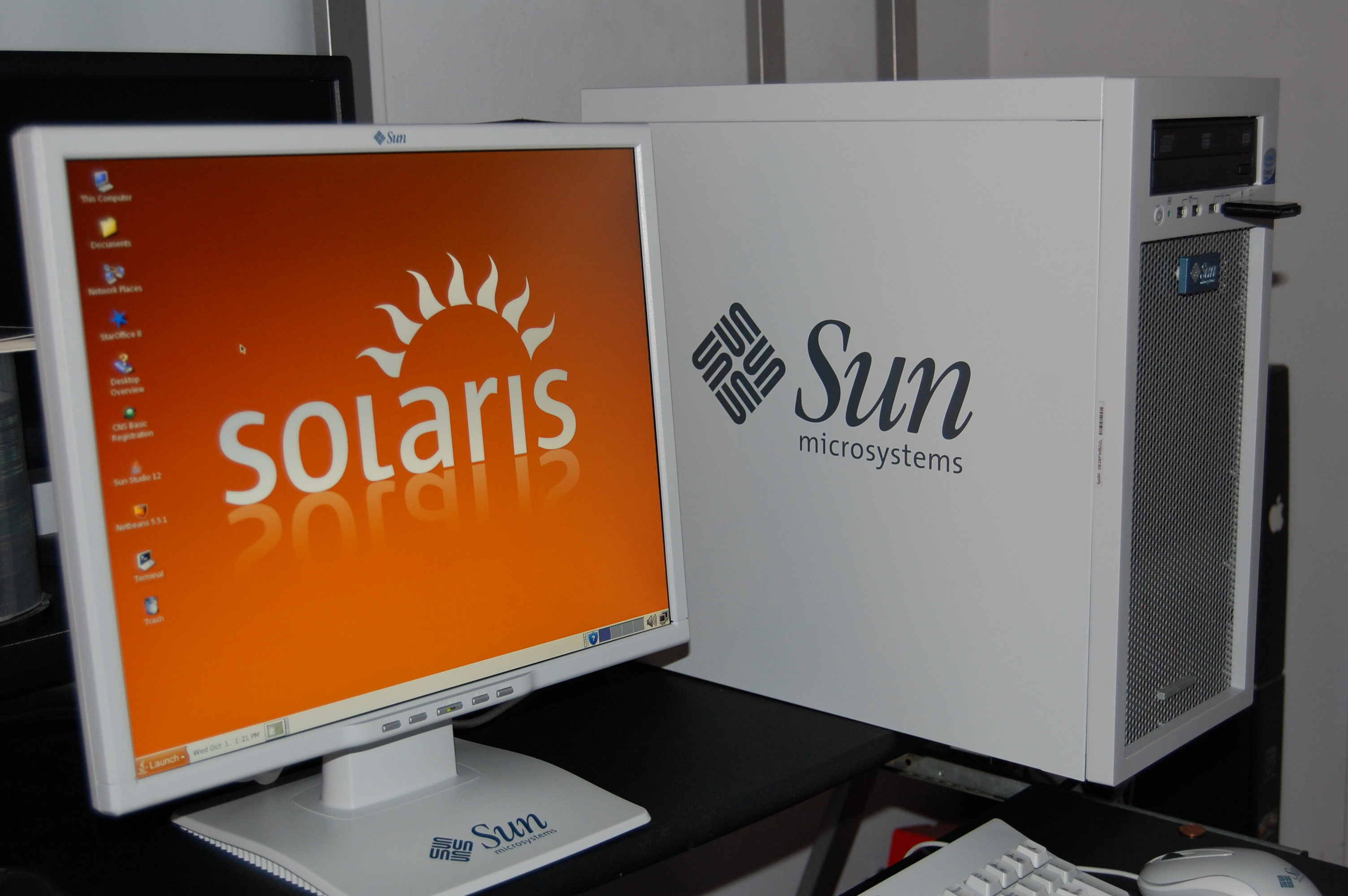
Picture of a Sun Ultra 24

The Ultra 24 is a family of computer workstations by Sun Microsystems based on the Intel Core 2 processor.

The Sun Ultra 24 launched in 2007, and shipped with Solaris 10 pre-installed. Other than Solaris, it is officially compatible with various flavours of Linux as well as Microsoft's Windows XP and Windows Vista.

== Features ==
- CPU: one Intel Core 2 processor, 2.0 GHz or higher:
  - Intel Core 2 Duo processor
  - Intel Core 2 Quad processor
  - Intel Core 2 Extreme processor
- Memory—ECC unbuffered DDR2-667 DIMMs, 4 DIMM slots, 8 GB maximum. Three DIMM sizes, 512 MB, 1 GB, and 2 GB
- Networking—Single Gigabit Ethernet integrated on motherboard, one RJ-45 port (rear)
- Hard Disk Drives—Up to four internal drives:
  - either up to four SATA drives, 3 TB maximum: 250 GB, 750 GB (7,200 rpm)
  - or, with optional PCIe SAS HBA: Up to four SAS drives, 1.2 TB maximum: 146 GB, 300 GB (15,000 rpm)
- Graphics: provided by a PCIe card
- PCI Express Slots:
  - Two full-length x16 Gen-2 slots
  - One full-length x8 slot (Electrically x4)
  - One full-length x1 slot

== See also ==
- Sun Ultra series: various Sun workstations and servers using SPARC, AMD or Intel processors.
