= Sun386i =

Computer workstation

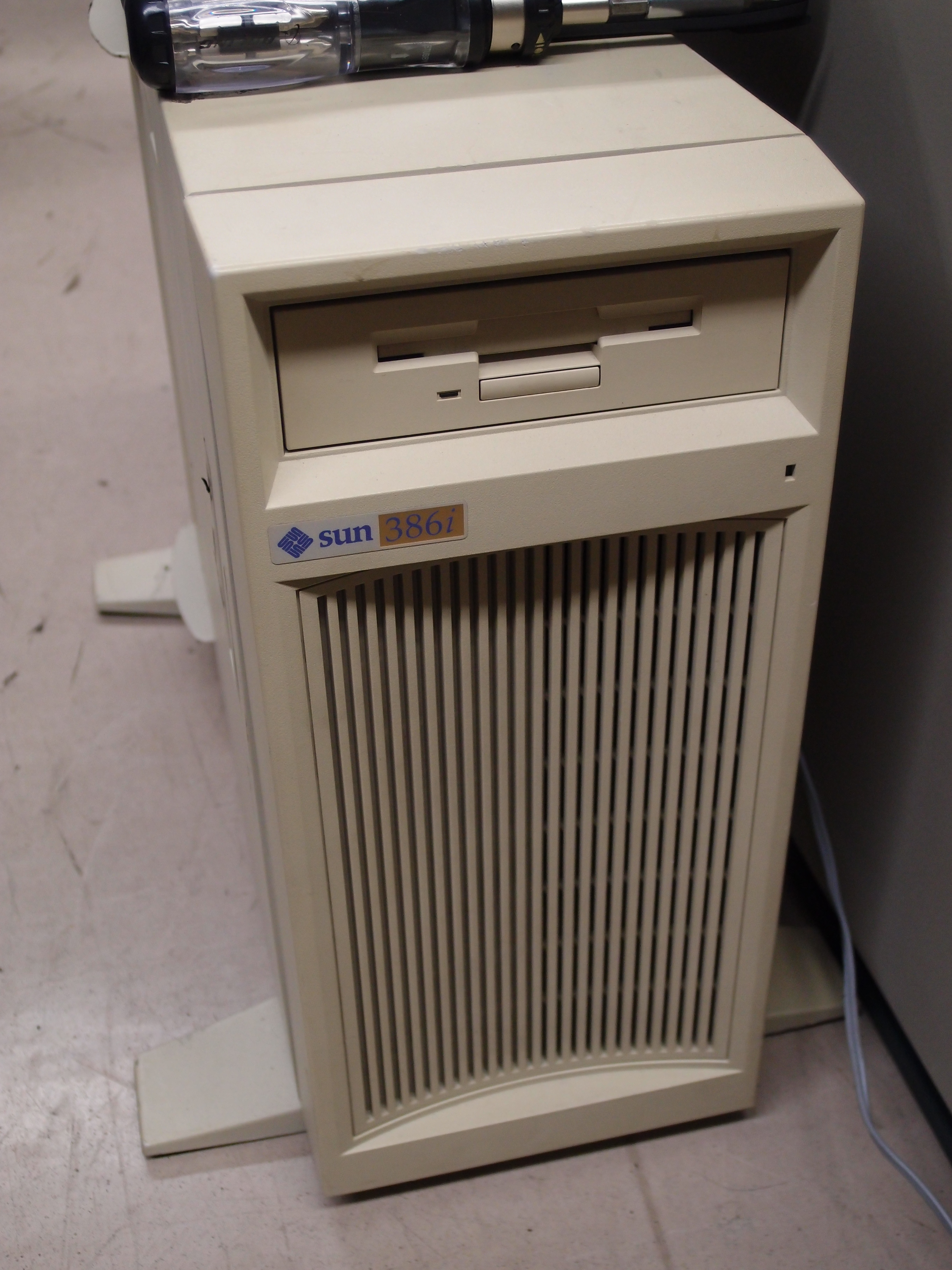
Sun386i

The Sun386i (codenamed Roadrunner) is a discontinued hybrid UNIX workstation/PC compatible computer system produced by Sun Microsystems, launched in 1988. It is based on the Intel 80386 microprocessor but shares many features with the contemporary Sun-3 series systems.

== Hardware ==
Unlike the Sun-3 models, the Sun386i has a PC-like motherboard and "mini-tower"-style chassis. Two variants were produced, the Sun386i/150 and the Sun386i/250 with a 20 or 25 MHz CPU respectively. The motherboard includes the CPU, 80387 FPU, 82380 timer/DMA/interrupt controller and a custom Ethernet IC called BABE ("Bus Adapter Between Ethernet"). Floppy disk, SCSI, RS-232 and Centronics parallel interfaces are also provided, as are four ISA slots (one 8-bit, three 16-bit) and four proprietary 32-bit "local" bus slots. The latter are used for RAM and frame buffer cards.

Two types of RAM card are available, a 4 or 8 MB card, and the "XP Cache" card, incorporating up to 8 MB with an 82385 cache controller and 32 KB of cache SRAM. Up to two memory cards can be installed, to give a maximum RAM capacity of 16 MB.

Mass storage options are either 91 or 327 MB internal SCSI hard disks and a 1.44 MB 3.5-in floppy drive. A storage expansion box that holds two more disks can be mounted to the top of the chassis.

Frame buffer options include the 1024×768 or 1152×900-pixel monochrome BW2 card, the 8-bit color CG3 with similar resolutions, or the accelerated 8-bit color CG5, otherwise known as the Roadracer or GXi framebuffer. This uses the TI TMS34010 graphics processor and had a resolution of 1152x900. In addition, a "SunVGA" accelerator card can be installed in the ISA expansion slot that allows a DOS session to display a full VGA window on the desktop.

The Sun386i introduced the Sun Type 4 keyboard, a hybrid of the earlier Type 3 and PC/AT layouts. This was later used for the SPARCstation line of workstations.

== Software ==
The Sun386i's firmware is similar to the Sun-3's "PROM Monitor". A 386 port of SunOS is the native operating system. SunOS releases 4.0, 4.0.1 and 4.0.2 support the architecture. A beta version of SunOS 4.0.3 for the Sun386i also exists but was not generally available, except possibly to the U.S. government. Included with SunOS are the SunView GUI and VP/ix MS-DOS emulator. This runs as a SunOS process and thus allows multiple MS-DOS session to be run simultaneously, a major selling point of the Sun386i. Unix long file names are accessed using a mapping to DOS 8.3 filenames, the file names being modified to include a tilde and to be unique as far as possible. This system is similar to, but predates, that used for long file names in Microsoft's VFAT. Special drive letters are used including H: for the user's home directory and D: for the current working directory when the DOS shell is started. The C: drive corresponds to a file in the Unix file system which appears to DOS as a 20 MB hard disk. This is used especially for the installation of copy-protected software; files in this virtual drive are inaccessible to Unix programs.

The Sun386i version of SunOS includes many features not found in the versions then shipped with Sun-3 workstations (and later with then-new SPARC workstations), in addition to VP/ix. These additions focus on ease of use for end users who are likely not to be UNIX experts, and includes enhanced desktop tools (which, for the first time at Sun, used color by default) and an "out of box experience" that was painless and administrator-free, targeted to bring a system onto the network ("box to mail") in fifteen minutes. It uses the pioneering Dynamic RARP network protocol. At the time, and for a few years afterwards until DHCP later became standard, no other vendors' workstations (or PCs) were as easy to install on TCP/IP networks.

== Sun486i ==
An upgraded model, the Sun486i (codename Apache) was designed, incorporating a 25 MHz 80486 CPU and improved SCSI interface. A small pre-production batch was built but the product was canceled in 1990, before its official launch.

== Easter egg ==
The inside surface of the right side cover has the Roadrunner logo and the developer's signatures molded in.

== Reception ==
BYTE in 1989 listed the Sun386i as among the "Excellence" winners of the BYTE Awards, praising its ability to run multiple MS-DOS applications under SunOS.

== See also ==
- SPARCstation
- Sun-2
- Sun-3
- Sun-4
- SunPCi
- Wabi (software)
