= Ultra 1 =

Family of Sun Microsystems workstations

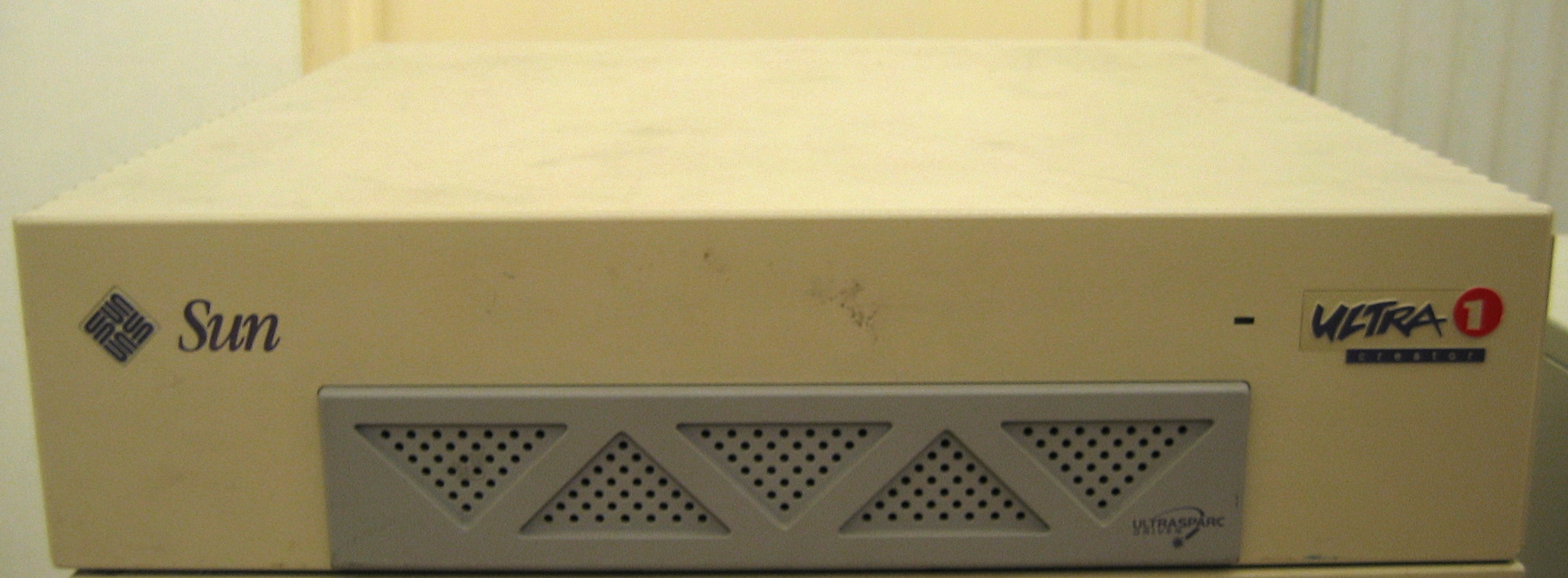
Sun Ultra 1 Creator

The Ultra 1 is a family of Sun Microsystems workstations based on the 64-bit UltraSPARC microprocessor. It was the first model in the Ultra series of Sun computers, which succeeded the SPARCstation series. It launched in November 1995 alongside the MP-capable Ultra 2 and shipped with Solaris 2.5. It is capable of running other operating systems such as Linux and BSD.

== Specifications ==
The Ultra 1 was available in a variety of specifications. The Ultra 1 Creator3D 170E launched with a list price of US$27,995 (equivalent to $59,200 in 2025) - along with the Ultra 1 Model 140, and Ultra 1 Creator 170E.

=== CPU ===
Three different CPU speeds were available: 143 MHz (Model 140), 167 MHz (Model 170) and 200 MHz (Model 200).

=== Models ===
Model numbers with an E suffix (Sun service code A12, code-named Electron) had two instead of three SBus slots, and added a UPA slot to allow the use of an optional Creator framebuffer. In addition, the E models had Wide SCSI and Fast Ethernet interfaces, in place of the narrow SCSI and 10BASE-T Ethernet of the standard Ultra 1 (service code A11, code-named Neutron).

=== Memory ===
The Ultra 1 uses 200-pin 5V ECC 60 ns SIMMs in pairs, the same memory used in the SPARCstation 20.

== Similar Machines ==
Similar Sun machines were the Netra i 1 servers which had the same chassis and the UltraServer 1/Ultra Enterprise 1 servers.

== See also ==
- Ultra series
