= UltraSPARC II =

Microprocessor developed by Sun Microsystems

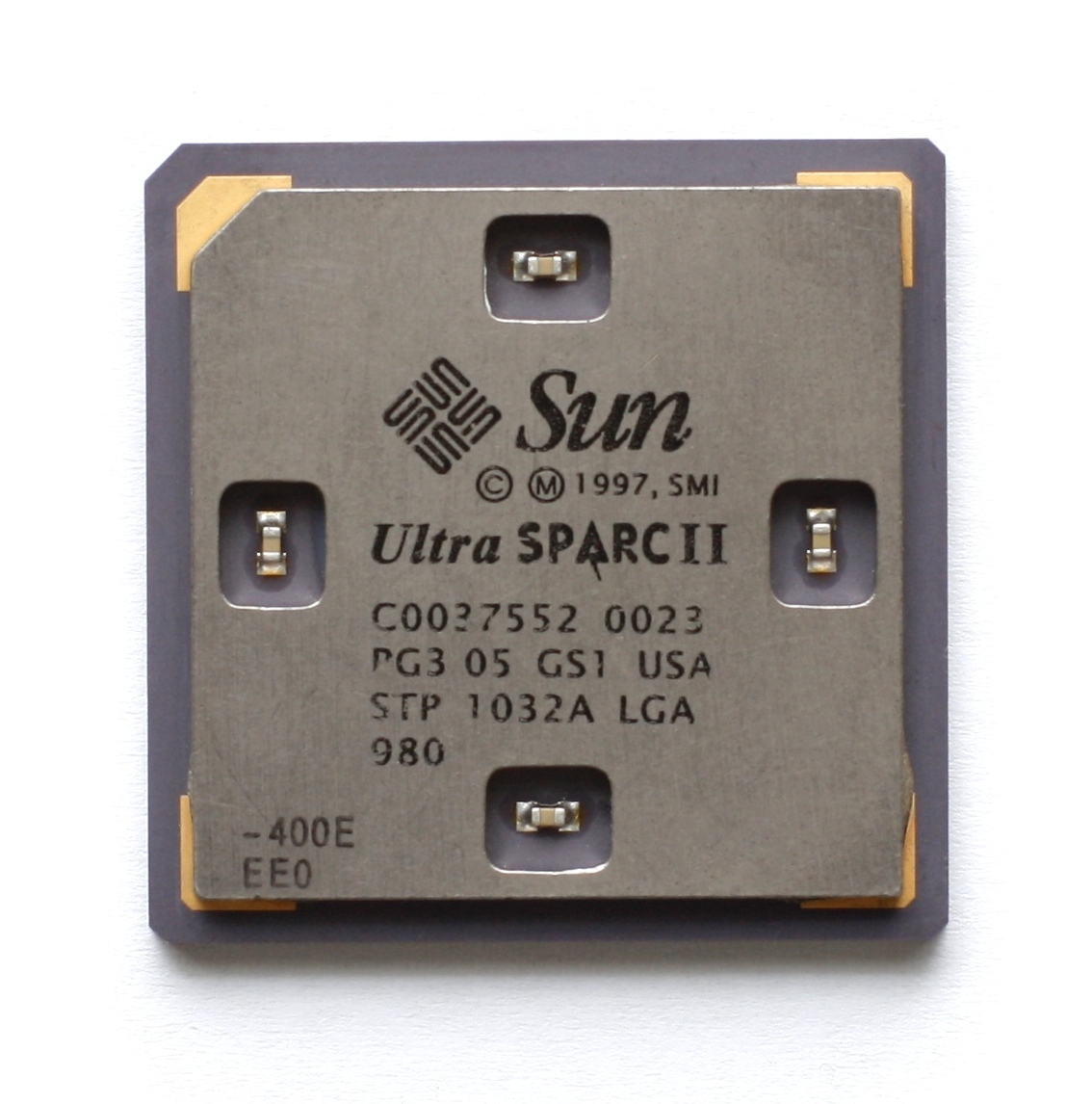
- Sun UltraSPARC-II front

General information
- Launched: 1997
- Discontinued: 2004
- Designed by: Sun Microsystems

Performance
- Max. CPU clock rate: 250 MHz to 650 MHz

Physical specifications
- Cores: 1

Architecture and classification
- Instruction set: SPARC V9

History
- Predecessor: UltraSPARC
- Successor: UltraSPARC III

The UltraSPARC II, code-named "Blackbird", is a microprocessor implementation of the SPARC V9 instruction set architecture (ISA) developed by Sun Microsystems. Marc Tremblay was the chief architect. Introduced in 1997, it was further development of the UltraSPARC operating at higher clock frequencies of 250 MHz, eventually reaching 650 MHz.

The die contained 5.4 million transistors and had an area of 149 mm^{2}. It was fabricated by Texas Instruments in their 0.35 μm process, dissipated 25 W at 205 MHz, and used a 2.5 V power supply. L2 cache capacity was 1 to 4 MB.

In 1999, the UltraSPARC II was ported to a 0.25 μm process. This version was code-named "Sapphire-Black". It operated at 360 to 480 MHz, possessed a die area of 126 mm^{2}, dissipated 21 W at 400 MHz and the power supply voltage was reduced to 1.9 V. Supported L2 cache capacity was increased to 1 to 8 MB.

The UltraSPARC II was plagued by reliability issues due to the use of radioactive IBM SRAM chips for the level 1 and 2 caches. These issues were not corrected until 1999, but many affected chips continued to be in use as late as 2001 owing to Sun discouraging the replacement of the affected units, and were unable to be mitigated due to Sun opting not to use ECC on the L1 and L2 caches and only using parity bits on the L2 cache. The alpha particles emitted by the chips caused severe stability issues and damaged customer trust in Sun, in addition to costing billions of dollars to replace failing hardware. Though the problem affected all UltraSPARC-II based systems until it was resolved, it primarily manifested on machines with more CPUs and larger caches running lighter loads (e.g. idling at night) due to larger caches having more room for errors to be introduced and quieter systems invalidating cache entries less frequently, allowing alpha particles more time to cause serious errors and trigger crashes.

== Derivatives ==
The UltraSPARC II was the basis for four derivatives.

=== UltraSPARC IIi ===
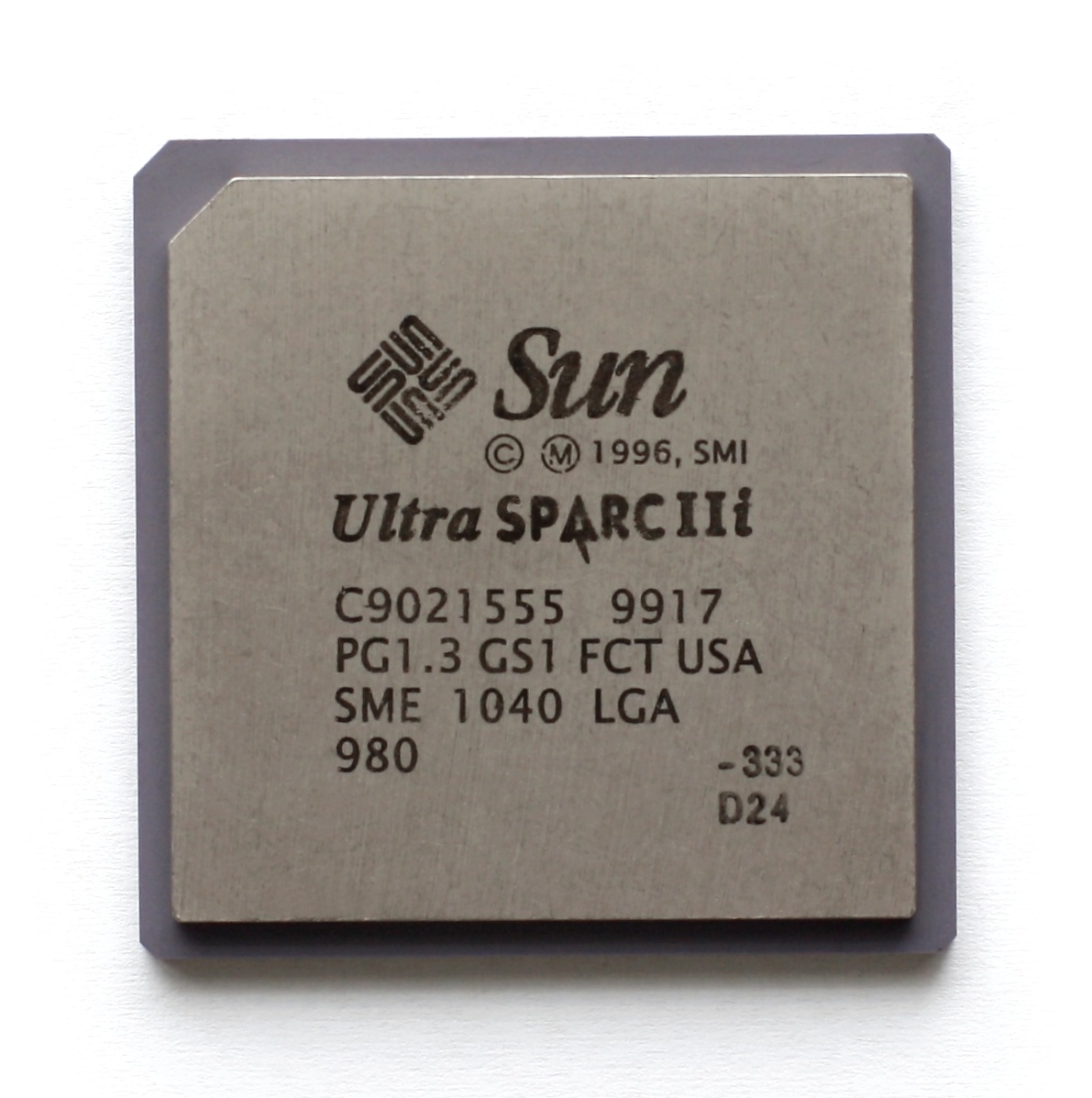
UltraSPARC IIi

The UltraSPARC IIi "Sabre" featuring on-chip PCI controller was a low-cost version introduced in 1997 that operated at 270 to 360 MHz. It was fabricated in a 0.35 μm process and possessed a die size of 156 mm^{2}. It dissipated 21 W and used a 1.9 V power supply. It had a 256 KB to 2 MB L2 cache. In 1998, a version code-named Sapphire-Red, was fabricated in a 0.25 μm process, enabling the microprocessor to operate at 333 to 480 MHz. It dissipated 21 W at 440 MHz and used a 1.9 V power supply.

=== UltraSPARC IIe ===
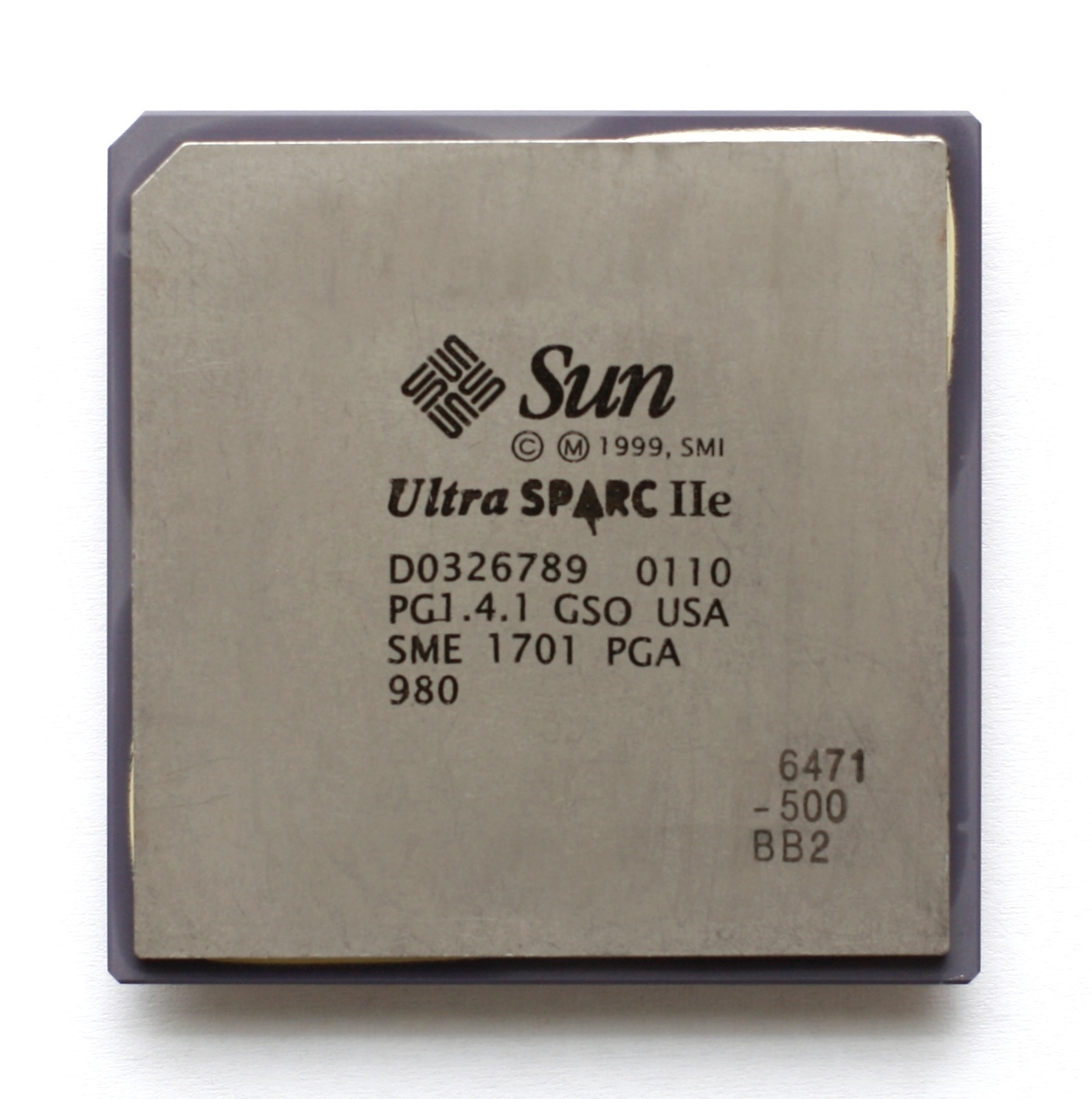
UltraSPARC IIe

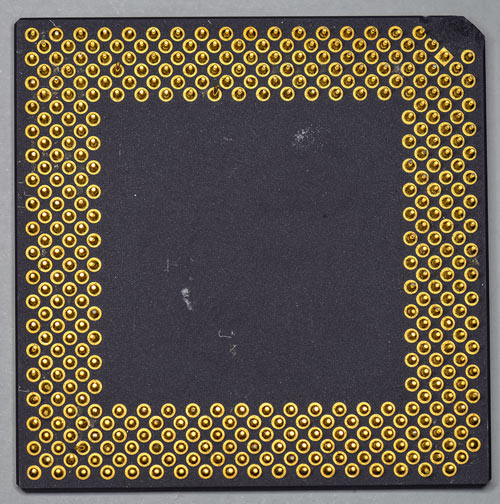
Sun UltraSPARC IIe (back side)

The UltraSPARC IIe "Hummingbird" was an embedded version introduced in 2000 that operated at 400 to 500 MHz, fabricated in a 0.18 μm process with aluminium interconnects. It dissipated a maximum of 13 W at 500 MHz, used a 1.5 to 1.7 V power supply and had a 256 KB L2 cache.

=== UltraSPARC IIe+ ===
The UltraSPARC IIe+ or IIi was introduced in 2002. Code-named "Phantom", it operated at 550 to 650 MHz and was fabricated in a 0.18 μm process with copper interconnect. It dissipated 17.6 W and used a 1.7 V power supply. It had a 512 KB L2 cache.

=== Gemini ===
UltraSPARC II dual-core

The Gemini was the first attempt by Sun to produce a multithreaded microprocessor. It had taped out, but was cancelled before it was introduced after the announcement of UltraSPARC T1 Niagara microprocessor in early 2004. It consisted of two UltraSPARC II cores and an on-die L2 cache on a single chip.

The DAC 2004 abstracts described the dual-core UltraSPARC II processor in Session 40. The "Dual-Core UltraSPARC (2003)" was based upon the UltraSPARC II microarchitecture and featured: DDR-1 memory controller, JBUS interface, parity protected L1 cache, ECC-protected dual 512KB on-chip L2 cache, 1.2 GHz clock frequency, 80 million transistors, 206 mm^{2} die size, and dissipated 23 watts of power.
