= Ultra Port Architecture =

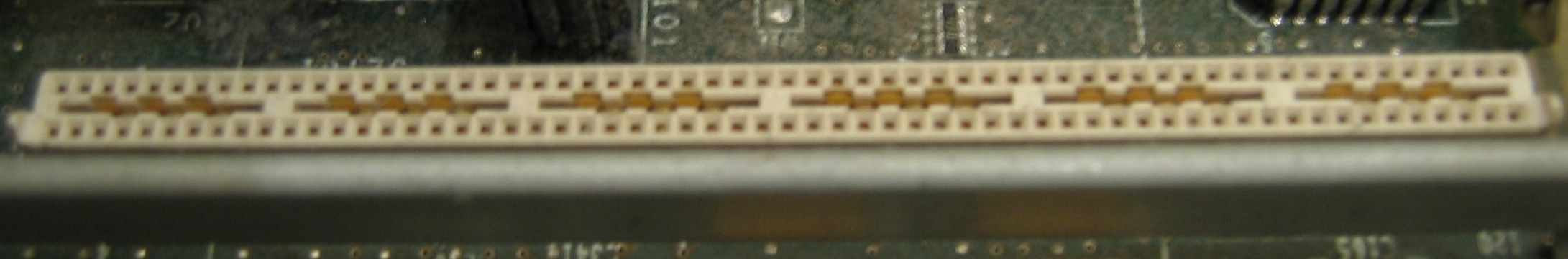
UPA bus on an Ultra 1 Creator

The Ultra Port Architecture (UPA) bus was developed by Sun Microsystems as a high-speed graphics card to CPU interconnect, beginning with the Ultra 1 workstation in 1995.

== See also ==
- List of device bandwidths
