= Floating Point Systems =

American computer hardware manufacturer (1970–1991)

Floating Point Systems, Inc.
- Industry: Computer systems and components
- Founded: 1970; 55 years ago
- Defunct: 1991
- Fate: Acquired by Cray
- Successor: Cray Research Superservers
- Key people: Norm Winningstad, founder and CEO

Floating Point Systems, Inc. (FPS), was a Beaverton, Oregon vendor of attached array processors and minisupercomputers. The company was founded in 1970 by former Tektronix engineer Norm Winningstad, with partners Tom Prints, Frank Bouton and Robert Carter. Carter was a salesman for Data General Corp. who persuaded Bouton and Prince to leave Tektronix to start the new company. Winningstad was the fourth partner.

== History ==
The original goal of the company was to supply economical, but high-performance, floating-point coprocessors for minicomputers. In 1976, the AP-120B array processor was produced. This was soon followed by a unit for larger systems and IBM mainframes, the FPS AP-190. In 1981, the follow-on FPS-164 was produced, followed by the FPS-264, which had the same architecture. This was five times faster, using ECL instead of TTL chips.

These processors were widely used as attached processors for scientific applications in reflection seismology, physical chemistry, NSA cryptology and other disciplines requiring large numbers of computations. Attached array processors were usually used in facilities where larger supercomputers were either not needed or not affordable. Hundreds if not thousands of FPS boxes were delivered and highly regarded. FPS's primary competition up to this time was IBM (3838 array processor) and CSP Inc.

Cornell University, led by physicist Kenneth G. Wilson, made a supercomputer proposal to NSF with IBM to produce a processor array of FPS boxes attached to an IBM mainframe with the name lCAP.

=== Parallel processing ===
In 1986, the T-Series hypercube computers using INMOS transputers and Weitek floating-point processors was introduced. The T stood for "Tesseract". Unfortunately, parallel processing was still in its infancy and the software tools and libraries for the T-Series did not facilitate customers' parallel programming. I/O was also difficult, so the T-Series was discontinued, a mistake costing tens of millions of dollars that was nearly fatal to FPS. A few dozen T-series were delivered.

=== Server and workstation products ===
Along with the newly introduced, low-end M64/20 and M64/30 floating-point processors, FPS introduced systems based on these processors in the form of the M64/220 and M64/230 "superservers", combining them with the Sun Microsystems Sun-3/50 workstation, offering 6 MFLOPS and 12 MFLOPS respectively, and priced from £125,000 to £200,000, alongside the M64/320 and M64/330 "superstations", combining their processors with the Digital Equipment Corporation VAXstation II/GPX, priced from £160,000 or $187,000 to £230,000 or $275,000.

FPS also took the opportunity in 1986 to rename various existing products to incorporate them into the M64 naming scheme, this affecting the FPS-164, FPS-264 and FPS-364 models. The performance of these products, described using peak MFLOPS figures in reporting, was also described in more detail in advertising, with the 38 peak MFLOPS of the FPS-264 corresponding to a LINPACK rating of 9.9 MFLOPS and a Whetstone rating of 19 MWIPS.

=== Collaboration with Digital ===
In 1987, FPS and Digital Equipment Corporation announced a range of VAX configurations that included the FPS M64/30 and M64/60 accelerators. The arrangement included a VAX 8200 system combined with the M64/30 priced at $330,000, and VAX 8550, 8700 and 8800 systems combined with the M64/60 priced from $1 million. The M64/30 was described as a 12 MFLOPS processor, with the M64/60 reportedly delivering 38 MFLOPS.

=== Celerity acquisition; acquisition by Cray ===
In 1988, FPS acquired the assets of Celerity Computing of San Diego, California, renaming itself as FPS Computing. Celerity's product lines were further developed by FPS, the Celerity 6000 minisupercomputer being developed into the FPS Model 500 series.

FPS was acquired by Cray in 1991 for $3.25 million, and their products became the S-MP and APP product lines of Cray Research.

The S-MP was a SPARC-based multiprocessor server (based on the Model 500); the MCP a matrix co-processor array based on eighty-four Intel i860 processors. After Cray purchased FPS, it changed the group's direction by making them Cray Research Superservers, Inc., later becoming the Cray Business Systems Division (Cray BSD). The MCP was renamed the Cray APP. The S-MP architecture was not developed further. Instead, it was replaced by the Cray Superserver 6400, (CS6400), which was derived indirectly from a collaboration between Sun Microsystems and Xerox PARC.

=== Acquisition by SGI and Sun ===
Silicon Graphics acquired Cray Research in 1996, and shortly afterward the Cray BSD business unit along with the CS6400 product line was sold to Sun Microsystems for an undisclosed amount, acknowledged later by a Sun executive to be "significantly less than $100 million", and estimated to be as low as $17 million. Sun was then able to bring to market the follow-on to the CS6400 which Cray BSD was developing at the time, codenamed Starfire, launching it as the Ultra Enterprise 10000 multiprocessor server. Sun reportedly sold 7,000 of these systems priced at around $1 million, generating "five billion plus of margin". This system was followed by the Sun Fire 15K and Sun Fire 25K. These systems allowed Sun to become a first tier vendor in the large server market. In January 2010, Sun was acquired by Oracle Corporation.

== See also ==
- Glen Culler
- Cydrome
- Multiflow
