= Cray CS6400 =

Multiprocessor server computer system

The Cray Superserver 6400, or CS6400, is a discontinued multiprocessor server computer system produced by Cray Research Superservers, Inc., a subsidiary of Cray Research, and launched in 1993. The CS6400 was also sold as the Amdahl SPARCsummit 6400E.

The CS6400 (codenamed SuperDragon during development) superseded the earlier SPARC-based Cray S-MP system, which was designed by Floating Point Systems. However, the CS6400 adopted the XDBus packet-switched inter-processor bus also used in Sun Microsystems' SPARCcenter 2000 (Dragon) and SPARCserver 1000 (Baby Dragon or Scorpion) Sun4d systems. This bus originated in the Xerox Dragon multiprocessor workstation designed at Xerox PARC. The CS6400 was available with either 60 MHz SuperSPARC-I or 85 MHz SuperSPARC-II processors, maximum RAM capacity was 16 GB.

Other features shared with the Sun servers included use of the same SuperSPARC microprocessor and Solaris operating system. However, the CS6400 could be configured with four to 64 processors on quad XDBusses at 55 MHz, compared with the SPARCcenter 2000's maximum of 20 on dual XDBusses at 40 or 50 MHz and the SPARCserver 1000's maximum of 8 on a single XDBus.

Unlike the Sun SPARCcenter 2000 and SPARCserver 1000, each CS6400 is equipped with an external System Service Processor (SSP), a SPARCstation fitted with a JTAG interface to communicate with the CS6400 to configure its internal bus control card. The other systems have a JTAG interface, but it is not used for this purpose. While the CS6400 only requires the SSP to be used for configuration changes (e.g. a CPU card is pulled for maintenance), some derivative designs, in particular the Sun Enterprise 10000, are useless without their SSP.

Upon Silicon Graphics' acquisition of Cray Research in 1996, the Superserver business (by now the Cray Business Systems Division) was sold to Sun. This included Starfire, the CS6400's successor then under development, which became the Sun Enterprise 10000.
