= UltraSPARC IV =

Microprocessor developed by Sun Microsystems

- UltraSPARC IV

General information
- Designed by: Sun Microsystems
- Common manufacturer: Texas Instruments

Performance
- Max. CPU clock rate: 1.05 GHz to 2.1 GHz

Physical specifications
- Cores: 2

Architecture and classification
- Instruction set: SPARC V9

History
- Predecessor: UltraSPARC III
- Successor: SPARC64 VI

The UltraSPARC IV Jaguar and follow-up UltraSPARC IV+ Panther are microprocessors designed by Sun Microsystems and manufactured by Texas Instruments. They are the fourth generation of UltraSPARC microprocessors, and implement the 64-bit SPARC V9 instruction set architecture (ISA). The UltraSPARC IV was originally to be succeeded by the UltraSPARC V Millennium, which was canceled after the announcement of the Niagara, now UltraSPARC T1 microprocessor in early 2004. It was instead succeeded by the Fujitsu-designed SPARC64 VI.

The UltraSPARC IV was developed as part of Sun's Throughput Computing initiative, which included the UltraSPARC V Millennium, Gemini and UltraSPARC T1 Niagara microprocessors. Of the four original designs in the initiative, two reached production: the UltraSPARC IV and the UltraSPARC T1. Whereas the Millennium and Niagara implemented block multithreading - also known as coarse-grained multithreading, the UltraSPARC IV implemented chip-multithreading (CMP) — multiple single-thread cores.

The UltraSPARC IV was the first multi-core SPARC processor, released in March, 2004. Internally, it implements two modified UltraSPARC III cores, and its physical packaging is identical to the UltraSPARC III with the exception of one pin. The UltraSPARC III cores were improved in a variety of ways. Instruction fetch, store bandwidth, and data prefetching were optimized. The floating-point adder implements additional hardware to handle more not a number (NaN) and underflow cases to avoid exceptions. Both cores share a L2 cache with a capacity of up to 16 MB but have their own L2 cache tags.

The UltraSPARC IV contains 66 million transistors and measures 22.1 mm by 16.1 mm (356 mm^{2}). It was fabricated by Texas Instruments in their 0.13 μm process.

The UltraSPARC IV+, released in mid-2005, is also a dual-core design, featuring enhanced processor cores and an on-chip L2 cache. It is fabricated on a 90 nanometer manufacturing process. The initial speed of the UltraSPARC IV+ was 1.5 GHz, 0.3 GHz less than the intended 1.8 GHz. In April, 2007 it was increased to 2.1 GHz. It contains 295 million transistors.

Servers using the UltraSPARC IV were released in September 2004. The UltraSPARC IV+ was released in Sun servers in September 2005. Sun Fire V490, V890, E2900, E4900, E6900, E20K and E25K systems all use UltraSPARC IV and IV+ processors. These systems range from 4 to 72 processor sockets (8 to 144 cores).

Servers powered by the UltraSPARC IV+ processor were well received, allowing Sun to regain revenue lead in the RISC/UNIX server market in 2006.

== See also ==
- Fireplane
