= Sun Fire =

Server series by Sun Microsystems

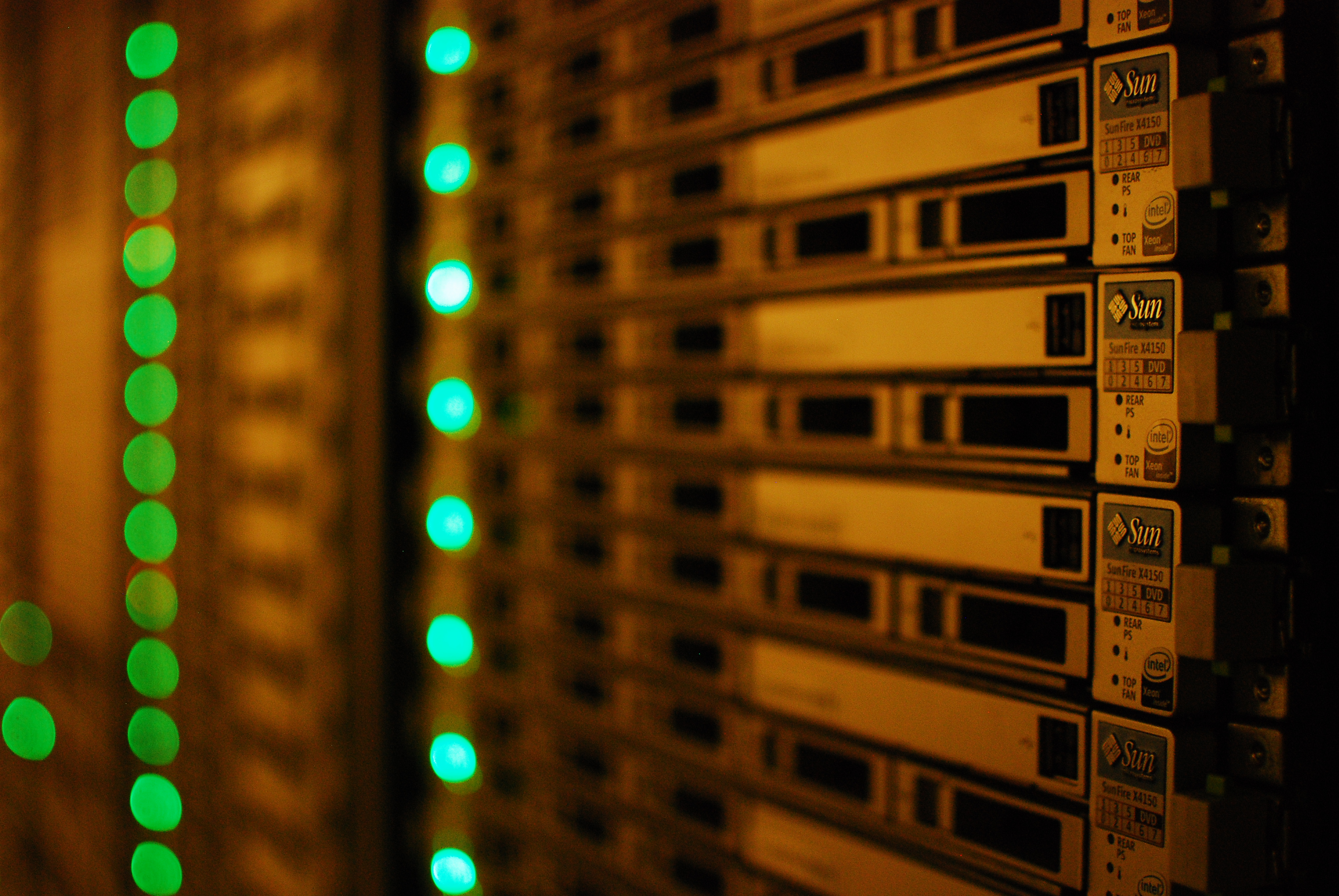
Sun Fire X4100 cluster

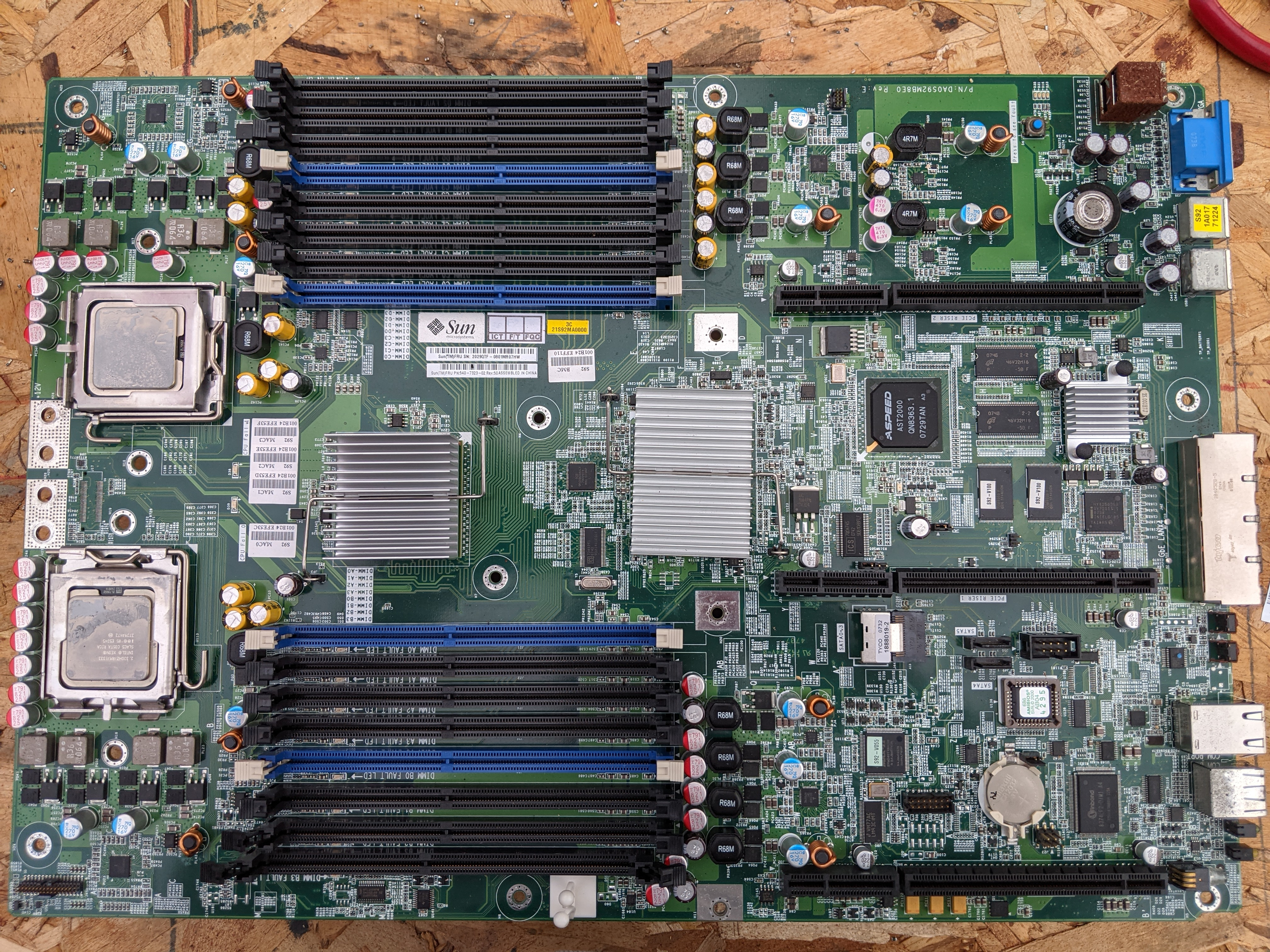
Sun Fire X4150 Motherboard

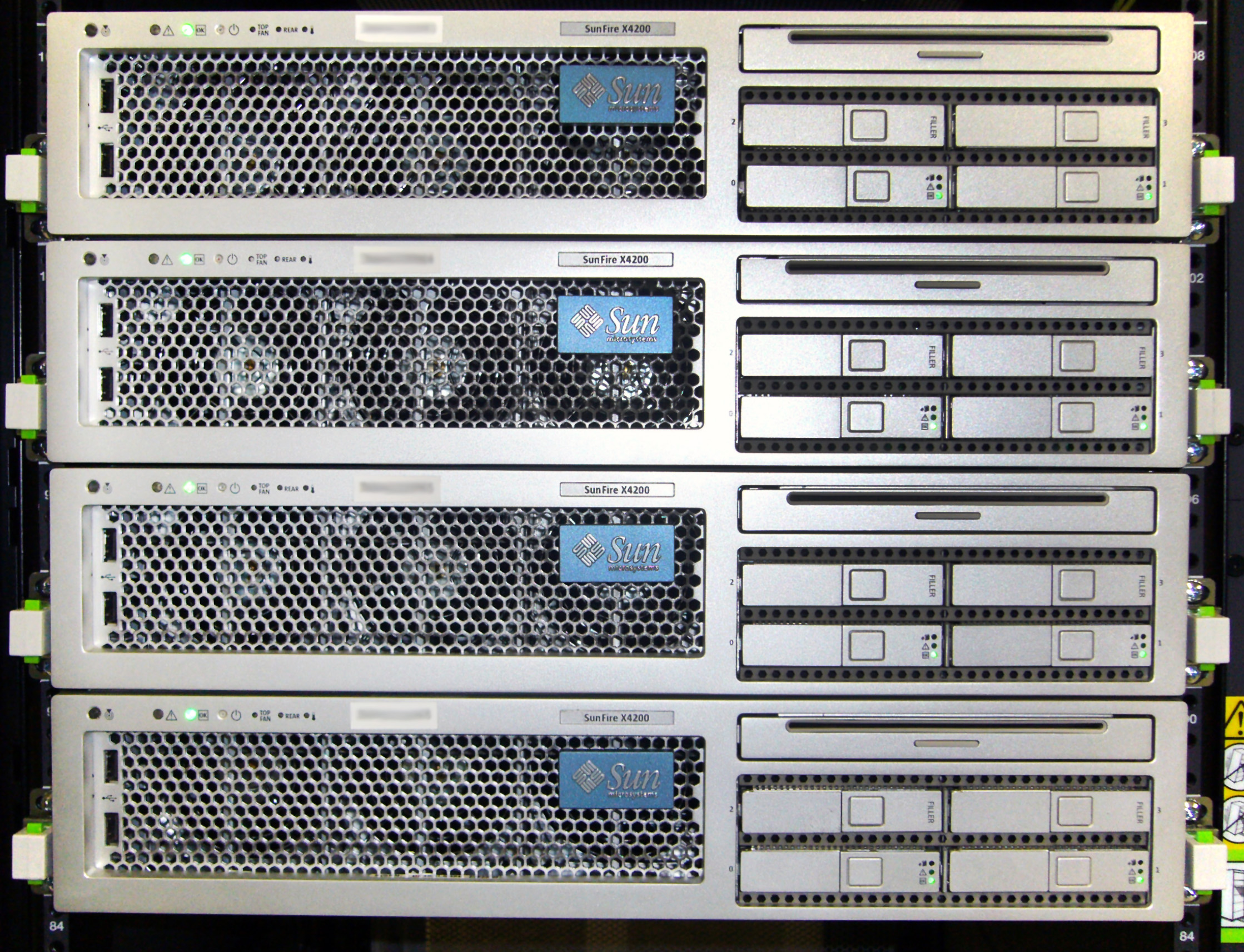
Sun Fire X4200 servers

Sun Fire is a series of server computers introduced in 2001 by Sun Microsystems (since 2010, part of Oracle Corporation). The Sun Fire branding coincided with the introduction of the UltraSPARC III processor, superseding the UltraSPARC II-based Sun Enterprise series. In 2003, Sun broadened the Sun Fire brand, introducing Sun Fire servers using the Intel Xeon processor. In 2004, these early Intel Xeon models were superseded by models powered by AMD Opteron processors. Also in 2004, Sun introduced Sun Fire servers powered by the UltraSPARC IV dual-core processor. In 2007, Sun again introduced Intel Xeon Sun Fire servers, while continuing to offer the AMD Opteron versions as well.

SPARC-based Sun Fire systems were produced until 2010, while x86-64 based machines were marketed until mid-2012. In mid-2012, Oracle Corporation ceased to use the Sun Fire brand for new server models.

== Operating systems ==
UltraSPARC-based Sun Fire models are licensed to run the Solaris operating system versions 8, 9, and 10. Although not officially supported, some Linux versions are also available from third parties, as well as OpenBSD and NetBSD.

Intel Xeon and AMD Opteron based Sun Fire servers support Solaris 9 and 10, OpenBSD, Red Hat Enterprise Linux versions 3 - 6, SUSE Linux Enterprise Server 10 and 11, Windows 2000, Windows Server 2003, 2008, and 2008 R2 .

== Model nomenclature ==
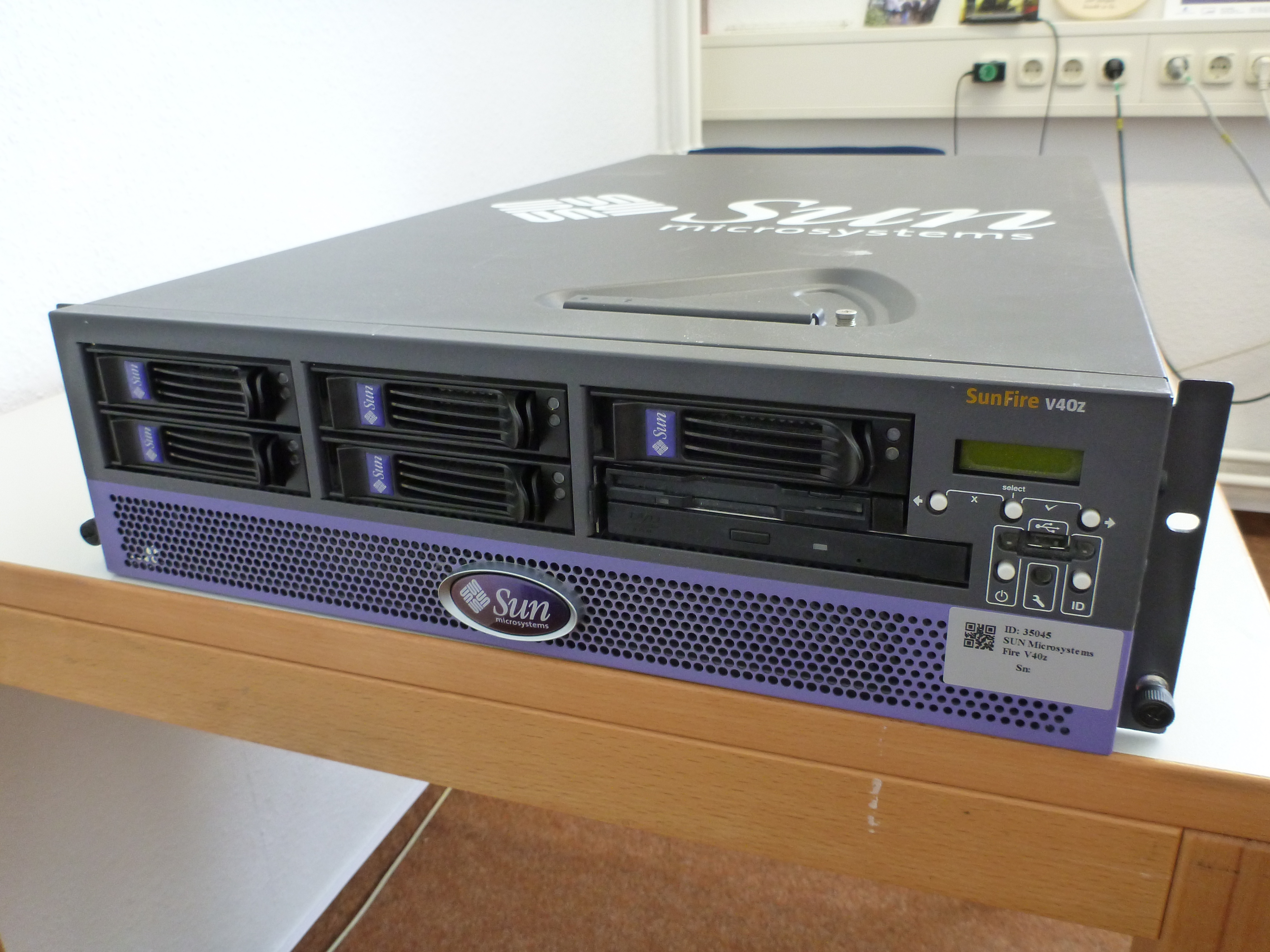
Sun Fire V40z with 4× AMD Opteron CPU

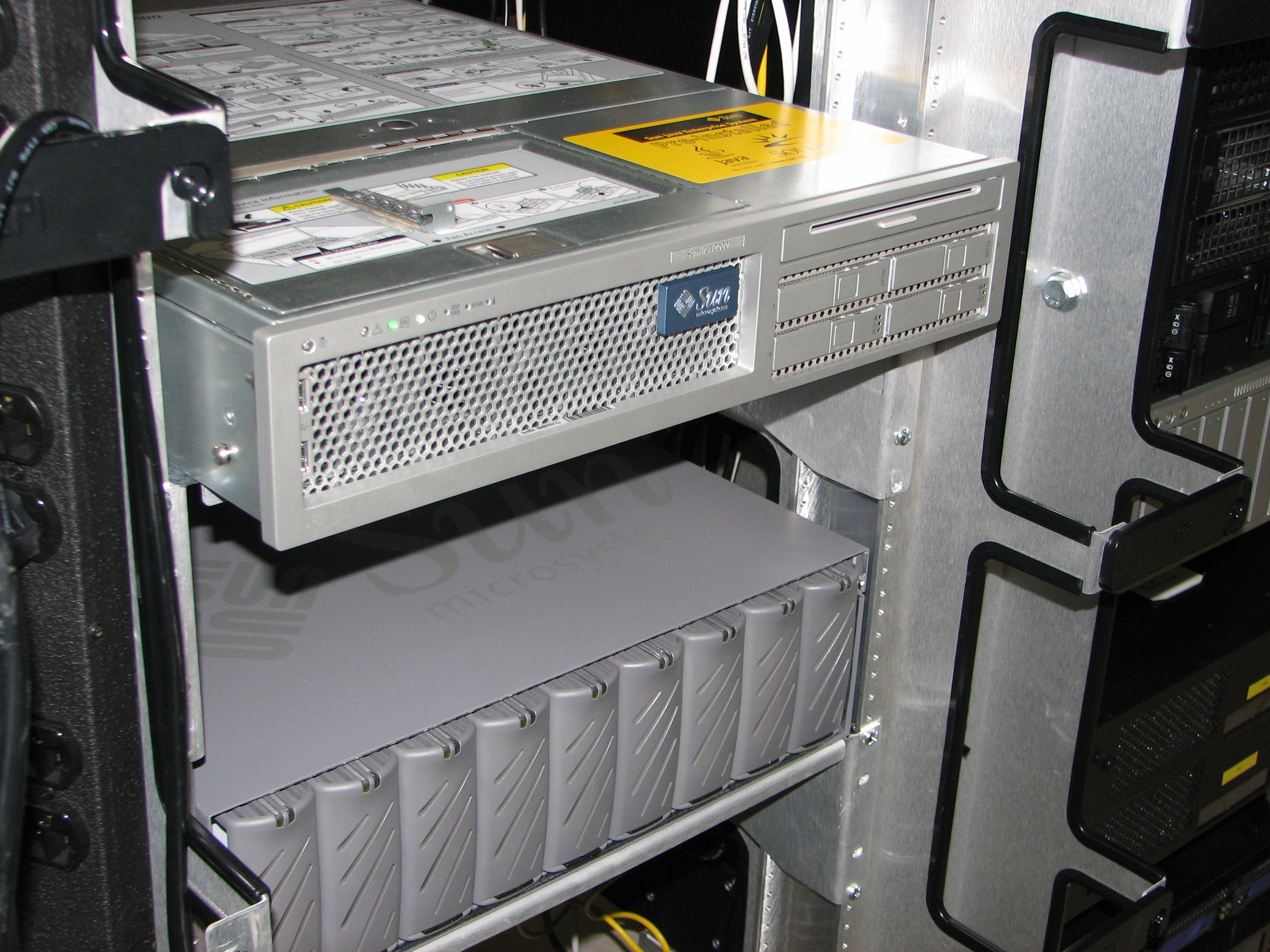
Sun Fire T2000 (top)

Later Sun Fire model numbers have prefixes indicating the type of system, thus:

- V: entry level and mid-range rackmount and cabinet servers (UltraSPARC, IA-32 or AMD64)
- E: high-end enterprise class cabinet servers with high-availability features (UltraSPARC)
- B: blade servers (UltraSPARC or IA-32)
- X: rackmount x86-64 based servers
- T: entry level and mid-range rackmount servers based on UltraSPARC T-series CoolThreads processors

When Sun offered Intel Xeon and AMD Opteron Sun Fire servers under the V-Series sub brand, Sun used an x suffix to denote Intel Xeon processor based systems and a z suffix for AMD Opteron processor based systems, but this convention was later dropped. The z suffix was also used previously to differentiate the V880z Visualization Server variant of the V880 server.

Sun's first-generation blade server platform, the Sun Fire B1600 chassis and associated blade servers, was branded under the Sun Fire server brand. Later Sun blade systems were sold under the Sun Blade brand.

In 2007, Sun, Fujitsu and Fujitsu Siemens introduced the common SPARC Enterprise brand for server products. The first SPARC Enterprise models were the Fujitsu-developed successors to the midrange and high-end Sun Fire E-series. In addition, the Sun Fire T1000 and T2000 servers were rebranded as the SPARC Enterprise T1000 and T2000 and sold under the Fujitsu brands, although Sun continued to offer these with their original names. Later T-series servers have also been badged SPARC Enterprise rather than Sun Fire.

Since late 2010, Oracle Corporation no longer uses Sun Fire brand for their current T series SPARC servers, and since mid-2012 for new X series x86-64 machines based on Intel Xeon CPUs. x86-64 server models which had been developed by Sun Microsystems before its acquisition, and were still in production, have all been rebranded as Sun Server X-series.

== Sun Fire model range ==
Some servers were produced in two versions, the original version and a later RoHS version. Since a general maintenance and upgrade guideline is that RoHS components and spares may be installed into the original non-RoHS versions of that server, the end-of-life (EOL) date of a server is deemed the EOL date of the RoHS version of that server in this listing.

=== UltraSPARC architecture ===
Model	Codename	RU	Max processors	Processor frequency	Max memory	Max disk capacity	EOL Date
280R	Littleneck	4	2× UltraSPARC III/III Cu	750, 900, 1015, 1200 MHz	8 GB	Two 3.5" FC-AL Disks	January 2005
V100	Flapjack-LiteCD500	1	1× UltraSPARC IIe/IIi	500 (IIe), 550 (IIi), 650 MHz (IIi)	2 GB (4GB)	Two 3.5" IDE Disks	June 2006
V120	Flapjack2 plus	1	1× UltraSPARC IIi	550, 650 MHz	4 GB	Two 3.5" SCSI Disks	June 2006
V125		1	1× UltraSPARC IIIi	1.0 GHz	8 GB	Two 3.5" Ultra160 SCSI Disks	April 2008
V210	Enchilada 1U	1	2× UltraSPARC IIIi	1.0, 1.33 GHz	16 GB	Two 3.5" Ultra320 SCSI Disks	September 2007
V215	Seattle 1U	1	2× UltraSPARC IIIi	1.5 GHz	16 GB	Two 2.5" SAS Disks	April 2008
V240	Enchilada 2U	2	2× UltraSPARC IIIi	1.0, 1.28, 1.33, 1.5 GHz	16 GB	Four 3.5" Ultra160 SCSI Disks	September 2007
V245	Seattle 2U	2	2× UltraSPARC IIIi	1.5 GHz	16 GB	Four 2.5" SAS Disks	April 2008
V250	Enchilada 2P Tower	5 (90° tilted)	2× UltraSPARC IIIi	1.06, 1.28 GHz	8 GB	Eight 3.5" Ultra160 SCSI Disks	September 2005
V440	Chalupa	4	4× UltraSPARC IIIi	1.062, 1.28, 1.593 GHz	32 GB	Four 3.5" Ultra320 SCSI Disks	September 2007
V445	Boston	4	4× UltraSPARC IIIi	1.593 GHz	32 GB	Eight 2.5" SAS Disks	April 2008
V480	Cherrystone	5	4× UltraSPARC III Cu	900, 1050, 1200 MHz	32 GB	Two 3.5" FC-AL Disks	December 2005
V490	Sebring	5	4× UltraSPARC IV/IV+	1.05, 1.35, 1.5, 1.8 GHz	64 GB	Two 3.5" FC-AL Disks	April 2009
V880	Daktari	17	8× UltraSPARC III	750, 900, 1050, 1200 MHz	64 GB	Twelve 3.5" FC-AL Disks	October 2005
V880z	Nandi	17	8× UltraSPARC III	750, 900, 1050, 1200 MHz	64 GB	Twelve 3.5" FC-AL Disks	March 2005
V890	Silverstone	17	8× UltraSPARC IV/IV+	1.2, 1.35, 1.5, 1.8, 2.1 GHz	128 GB	Twelve 3.5" FC-AL Disks	April 2009
V1280	Lightweight 8	12	12× UltraSPARC III Cu, IV, IV+	900, 1050, 1200 (III Cu), 1050, 1200, 1350 (IV), 1500 MHz (IV+)	192 GB	Two 3.5" UltraSCSI Disks	October 2007
3800	Serengeti 8	8.5	8× UltraSPARC III Cu	750, 900, 1050, 1200 MHz	64 GB	StorEdge D240 Media Tray	August 2003
4800	Serengeti 12	17.5	12× UltraSPARC III, III Cu, IV, IV+	750 (III), 900, 1050, 1200 (III Cu), 1050, 1200, 1350 (IV), 1500, 1800 MHz (IV+)	192 GB	StorEdge D240 Media Tray	May 2005
4810	Serengeti 12i	21	12× UltraSPARC III, III Cu, IV, IV+	750 (III), 900, 1050, 1200 (III Cu), 1050, 1200, 1350 (IV), 1500, 1800 MHz (IV+)	192 GB	StorEdge D240 Media Tray	June 2003
6800	Serengeti 24	28	24× UltraSPARC III, III Cu, IV, IV+	750 (III), 900, 1050, 1200 (III Cu), 1050, 1200, 1350 (IV), 1500, 1800 MHz (IV+)	384 GB	StorEdge D240 Media Tray	May 2005
12K	StarKitty	N/A	52× UltraSPARC III Cu, IV	900, 1050, 1200 (III Cu), 1050, 1200, 1350 (IV) MHz	288 GB	Two SCSI Disks	February 2005
15K	StarCat	N/A	106× UltraSPARC III Cu or 72× UltraSPARC IV	900, 1050, 1200 (III Cu), 1050, 1200, 1350 (IV) MHz	576 GB	Two SCSI Disks	February 2005
E2900	Amazon 2	12	12× UltraSPARC III Cu, IV or IV+	0.9, 1.2 (III Cu), 1.05, 1.2, 1.35 (IV), 1.5, 1.8 GHz (IV+)	192 GB	Two Ultra320 SCSI 3.5"	January 8, 2009
E4900	Amazon 4	17.5	12× UltraSPARC III Cu, IV or IV+	0.9, 1.05, 1.2 (III Cu), 1.05, 1.2, 1.35 (IV), 1.5, 1.8 GHz (IV+)	192 GB	None	January 8, 2009
E6900	Amazon 6	28	24× UltraSPARC III Cu, IV or IV+	0.9, 1.05, 1.2 (III Cu), 1.05, 1.2, 1.35 (IV), 1.5, 1.8 GHz (IV+)	384 GB	None	January 8, 2009
E20K	Amazon 20	N/A	36× UltraSPARC III Cu, IV or IV+	0.9, 1.05, 1.2 (III Cu, 1.05, 1.2, 1.35 (IV), 1.5, 1.8 GHz (IV+)	576 GB	None	January 8, 2009
E25K	Amazon 25	N/A	72× UltraSPARC IV or IV+	0.9, 1.05, 1.2 (III Cu, 1.05, 1.2, 1.35 (IV), 1.5, 1.8 GHz (IV+)	1152 GB	None	January 8, 2009
T1000	Erie	1	1× UltraSPARC T1	1.0 GHz	32 GB	One 3.5" SATA or Two 2.5" SAS	January 2010
T2000	Ontario	2	1× UltraSPARC T1	1.0, 1.2, 1.4 GHz	64 GB	Up to four 2.5" SAS	January 2010
T5120	Huron 1U	1	1× UltraSPARC T2	1.2, 1.4, 1.6 GHz	128 GB	Up to eight 2.5" SAS	May 2012
T5140	Maramba 1U	1	2× UltraSPARC T2 Plus	1.2, 1.4 GHz	128 GB	Up to eight 2.5" SAS	August 2011
T5220	Huron 2U	2	1× UltraSPARC T2	1.2, 1.4, 1.6 GHz	128 GB	Up to sixteen 2.5" SAS	August 2011
T5240	Maramba 2U	2	2× UltraSPARC T2 Plus	1.2, 1.4 GHz	256 GB	Up to sixteen 2.5" SAS	November 2011
T5440	Batoka	4	4× UltraSPARC T2 Plus	1.2, 1.4 GHz	512 GB	Up to four 2.5" SAS	August 2012

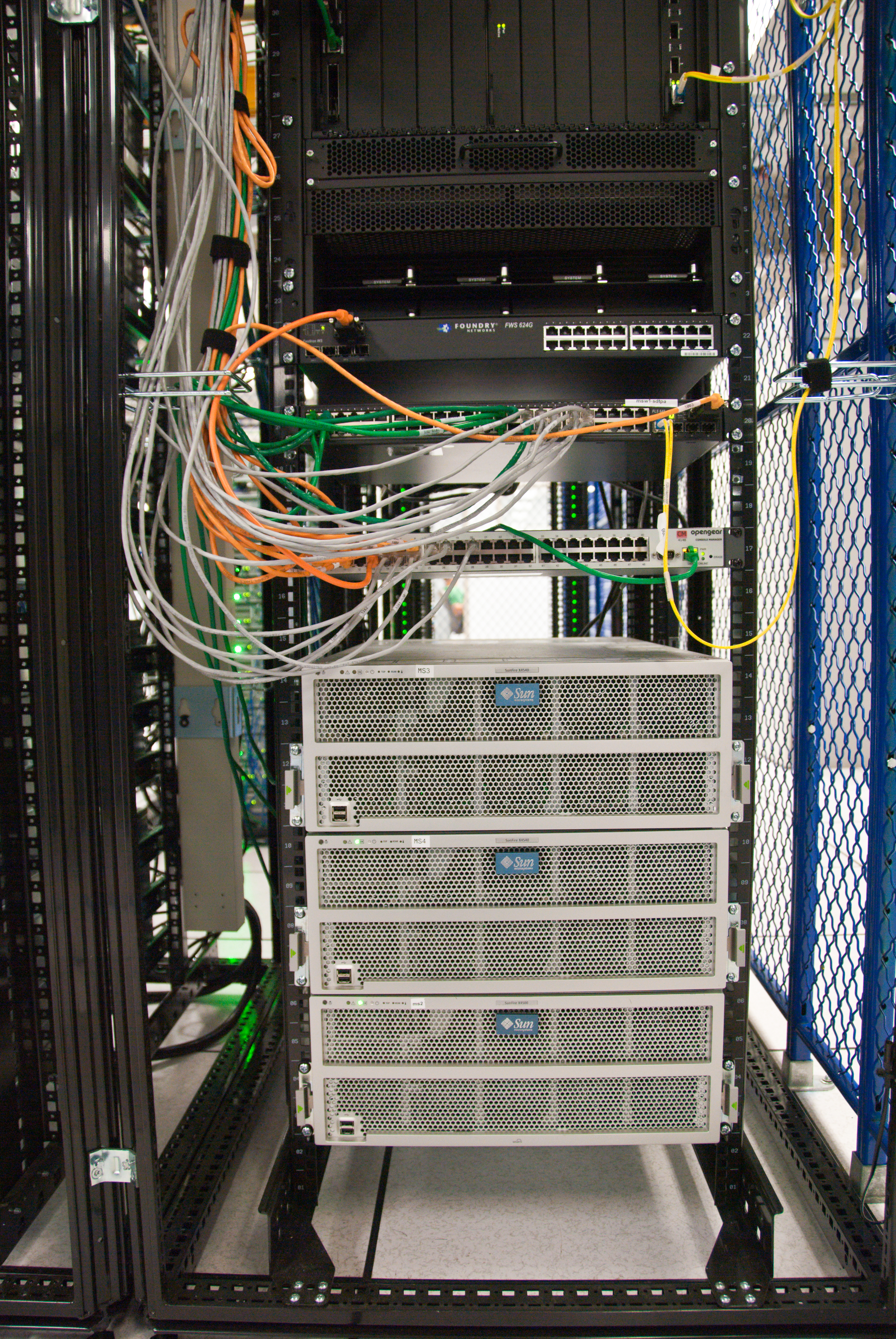
The SunFire X4540 was used as Wikimedia servers in 2010

=== x86/x64 architecture ===
Model	Codename	RU	Max processors	Processor models	Max memory	Max disk capacity	GA Date - EOL Date
V20z	Stinger	1	2× AMD Opteron	242, 244, 248, 250, 252, 270, 275	16 GB	2x SCSI 3.5" Ultra320	November 8, 2007
V40z	Stinger	3	4× AMD Opteron	844, 848, 850, 852, 854, 856, 870, 875, 880, 885	64 GB	6× SCSI 3.5" Ultra320	March 30, 2007
V60z / V60x		1	2× Intel Xeon	2.8, 3.06, 3.2 GHz	6 GB	3× SCSI 3.5" Ultra320	January 2005
V65z / V65x		2	2× Intel Xeon	2.8, 3.06, 3.2 GHz	12 GB	6× SCSI 3.5" Ultra320	January 2005
X2100	Aquarius	1	1× AMD Opteron	146, 148, 152, 154, 156, 175, 180	8 GB	2× SATA 3.5"	April 2007
X2100 M2		1	1× AMD Opteron	1218, 1214, 1210	8 GB	2× SATA 3.5"	
X2200 M2		1	2× AMD Opteron	2218HE, 2222, 2218, 2210, 2220, 2214	64 GB	2× SATA 3.5"	
X2250		1	2× Intel Xeon	X5482, E5472, X5472, E5462, X5272, X5460, E5405, L5420	32 GB	2× SATA 3.5"	
X2270 M2		1	2× Intel Xeon	5600 series	96 GB	4× SATA 3.5"	2010
X4100		1	2× AMD Opteron	248, 252, 254, 256, 275, 280, 285	16 GB	4× SAS 2.5"	May 28, 2008
X4100 M2		1	2× AMD Opteron	2220, 2222SE, 2218HE, 2222, 2210, 2218, 2220SE, 2216	32 GB	4× SAS 2.5"	
X4140	Dorado	1	2× AMD Opteron	2218 HE, 2222	64 GB	8× SAS 2.5"	
X4150	Doradi?	1	2× Intel Xeon	5160, L5310, L5320, E5345, E5355, E5335, E5410, E5440	64 GB	8× SAS 2.5"	
X4170		1	2× Intel Xeon	5500 series	144 GB	8× SATA/SAS 2.5"	2009
X4170 M2		1	2× Intel Xeon	5600 series	144 GB	8× SAS 2.5"	2010
X4200		2	2× AMD Opteron	248, 252, 254, 256, 275, 280, 285	16 GB	4× SAS 2.5"	May 28, 2008
X4200 M2		2	2× AMD Opteron	2210, 2216, 2218, 2220SE, 2222SE, 2220, 2222, 2218HE	32 GB	4× SAS 2.5"	
X4240		2	2× AMD Opteron	2218 HE, 2222, 2224 SE, 2347 HE, 2356	64 GB	8× SAS + 8× SATA 2.5" (up to 16 in total)	
X4250	Aries	2	2× Intel Xeon	X5482, E5472, X5472, E5462, X5272, X5460, E5405, L5420	64 GB	16× SAS 2.5"	
X4270		2	2× Intel Xeon	5500 series	144 GB	16× SATA/SAS 2.5"	2009
X4270 M2		2	2× Intel Xeon	5600 series	144 GB	12× SATA/SAS 3.5" or 24× SATA/SAS 2.5"	2010
X4275		2	2× Intel Xeon	5500 series	144 GB	12× SATA/SAS 3.5"	August 2009 - ?
X4440		2	4× AMD Opteron	8218, 8222, 8224	128 GB	8× SAS 2.5" or 6× SATA 2.5"	
X4450	Argo	2	4× Intel Xeon	E7220, L7345, E7320, E7340, X7350	128 GB	8× SAS 2.5" or 6× SATA 2.5"	
X4500	Thumper	4	2× AMD Opteron	285, 290	16 GB	48× SATA 3.5"	
X4540	Thor	4	2× AMD K10		128 GB	48× SATA 3.5"	
X4470		3	4× Intel Xeon	7500 series	512 GB	6× SATA/SAS 2.5"	2010
X4470 M2		3	4× Intel Xeon	E7-4800 series	1024 GB	6× SATA/SAS 2.5"	2011
X4600		4	8× AMD Opteron	856, 885	256 GB; 32x8 GB	4× SAS 2.5"	August 8, 2007
X4600 M2		4	8× AMD Opteron	8218, 8220SE, 8220, 8216, 8360SE	512 GB; 64x8 GB	4× SAS 2.5"	
X4800		5	8× Intel Xeon	7500 series	1 TB	8× SATA/SAS 2.5"	2010
X4800 M2		5	8× Intel Xeon	8800 series	2 TB	8× SATA/SAS 2.5"	2011

== Sun Server / Oracle Server ==
As of 2012, the x86 server range continued under the "Sun Server" or "Oracle Server" names.

Model	RU	Max processors	Processor models	Max memory	Max disk capacity	GA Date
X2-4 / X4470 M2	3	4× Intel Xeon	E7-4800 series	1 TB	6× SAS 600 GB	July 2011
X2-8 / X4800 M2	5	8× Intel Xeon	E7-8800 series	4 TB	8× SAS 600 GB	July 2011
X3-2 / X4170 M3	1	2× Intel Xeon	E5-2600 series	512 GB	8× SAS 600GB	April 2012
X3-2L / X4270 M3	2	2× Intel Xeon	E5-2600 series	512 GB	24× SAS 600 GB	April 2012
X4-2	1	2× Intel Xeon	E5-2600 v2 series	512 GB	8× SAS-2 600 GB	September 2013
X4-2L	2	2× Intel Xeon	E5-2600 v2 series	512 GB	24× SAS-2 600 GB	September 2013
X4-4	3	4× Intel Xeon	E7-8895 v2	3 TB	6× SAS-2 1.2 TB	April 2014
X4-8	5	8× Intel Xeon	E7-8895 v2	6 TB	8× SAS-2 1.2 TB	June 2014
X5-2	1	2× Intel Xeon	E5-2600 v3 series	768 GB	8× SAS-2 1.2 TB	December 2014
X5-2L	2	2× Intel Xeon	E5-2600 v3 series	768 GB	24× SAS-2 1.2 TB	December 2014
X5-4	3	4× Intel Xeon	E7-8895 v3	3 TB	6× SAS-2 1.2 TB	June 2015
X5-8	5	8× Intel Xeon	E7-8895 v3	6 TB	8× SAS-2 1.2 TB	July 2015
X6-2	1	2× Intel Xeon	E5-2600 v4 series	768 GB	8× SAS-2 1.2 TB	April 2016
X6-2L	2	2× Intel Xeon	E5-2600 v4 series	768 GB	24× SAS-2 1.2 TB	April 2016
X7-2	1	2× Intel Xeon	Xeon Platinum 8160	1.5 TB	8× SAS-3	October 2017
X7-2L	2	2× Intel Xeon	Xeon Platinum 8168	1.5 TB	12× SAS-3	October 2017
X7-8	5	8× Intel Xeon	Xeon Platinum 8168	6 TB	8× SAS-3	October 2017
X8-2	1	2× Intel Xeon	Xeon Platinum 8260	1.5 TB	8× SAS-3	April 2019
X8-2L	2	2× Intel Xeon	Xeon Platinum 8268	1.5 TB	12× SAS-3	April 2019
X8-8	5	8× Intel Xeon	Xeon Platinum 8268	6 TB	8× SAS-3	April 2019

== See also ==
- Fireplane
