= T2000 =

T2000 may refer to:

- Bombardier T2000, a tram design by Bombardier Transportation
- Finnish hovercraft Tuuli (T-2000)
- OS T2000, a train class of the Oslo Metro
- SNCF Class T 2000, a French train class
- Sun T2000, a Sun Fire server model
- a former designation for the RENFE Class 352, a Spanish locomotive class
- The tennis racket Wilson T2000, the first steel tennis racket
- A truck built by Kenworth from 1997 to 2010
