= Celerity Computing =

American minisupercomputer manufacturer (1983–1988)

Celerity Computing, Inc.
- Company type: Public
- Industry: Computer
- Founded: May 1983; 42 years ago
- Founders: Steve Vallender; Nick Aneshansley; Andrew McCroklin
- Defunct: September 1988; 36 years ago
- Fate: Acquired by Floating Point Systems
- Products: Minisupercomputers

Celerity Computing, Inc., was a publicly traded vendor of Unix-based minisupercomputers based in San Diego, California. Celerity Computing was founded in May 1983 by Steve Vallender, Nick Aneshansley and Andrew McCroklin. All were former employees of NCR Corporation.

Celerity shipped its first product, the C1200 Personal Workstation in November 1984. The C1200 was the first in a series of machines using the ACCEL RISC architecture, based on the NCR/32 32-bit processor. The C1200 offered a color monitor with up to 1280 by 1024 resolution. The C1200 was followed by the C1230 and C1260 models. The C1260 offered a dual processor option. The C1230 and C1260 were often used as multi-user systems. The C1200 series ran a version of BSD 4.2 Unix with System V Release 2 functionality merged in.

Celerity attempted to make the transition to being a minisupercomputer vendor with the development of the Celerity 6000, based on the ACCEL architecture implemented in ECL based on parts from Bipolar Integrated Technology. The Celerity 6000 had a 33-MHz system clock and up to 8 processors (max 8 scalar processors or 4 scalar processors and 4 vector processors). After running into financial difficulties during the development of the Celerity 6000, the assets and technologies of Celerity Computing were acquired by Floating Point Systems—itself financially ailing—in September 1988. The Celerity 6000 was completed and released as the FPS Model 500 minisupercomputer.

Celerity's assets changed hands multiple times in the following years through acquisitions and selloffs: Floating Point Systems sold to Cray in 1991; Cray sold to Silicon Graphics in 1996; and Silicon Graphics sold their Cray Business Systems Division to Sun Microsystems later that year. Many of the software and hardware engineers who were employed at Celerity—including McCrocklin and Campbell—were kept on board all the way to Sun Microsystems and beyond. The business unit they worked in under Sun Microsystems was renamed to Enterprise Systems Products (ESP).
