= Thrustmaster =

American video game peripheral manufacturer

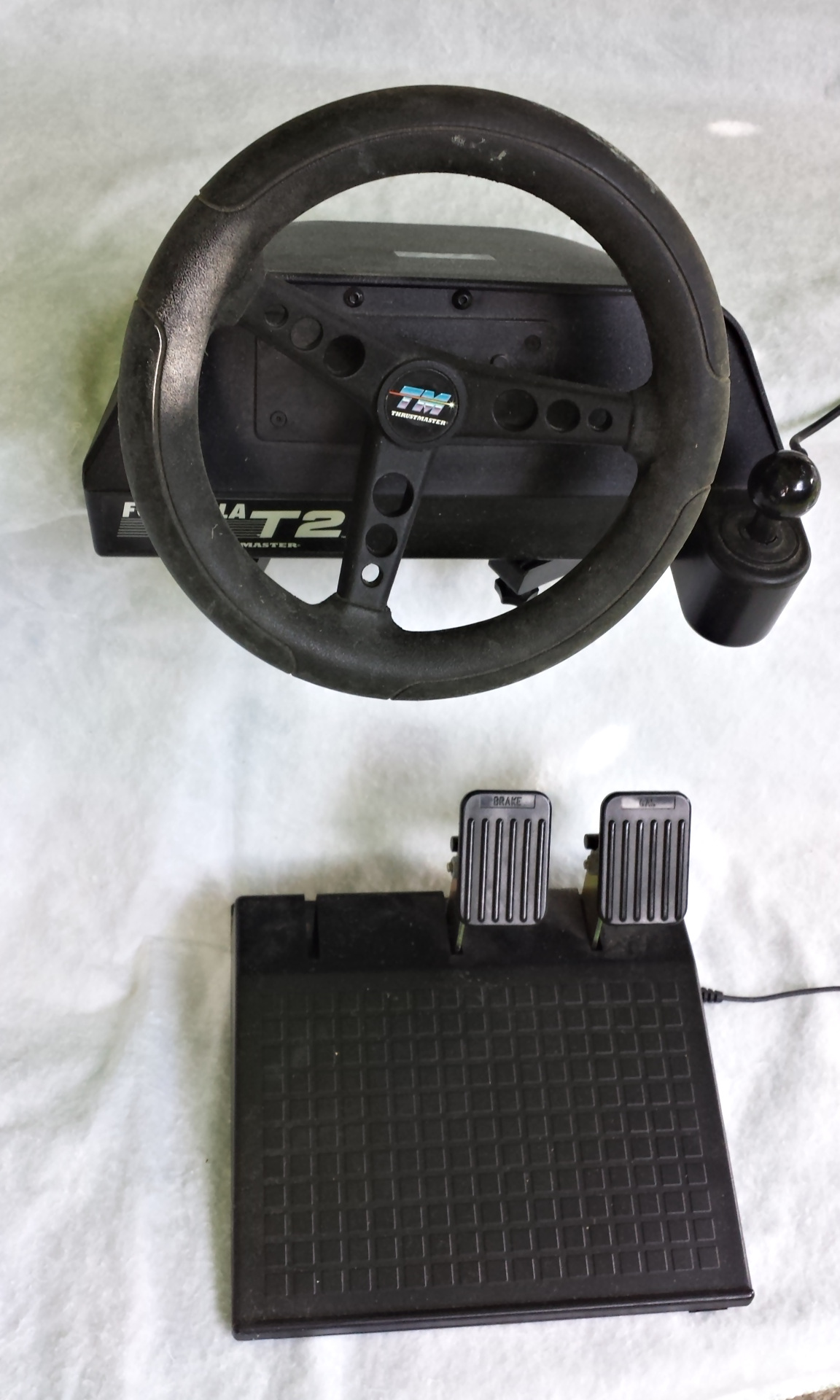
- Type: Brand
- Industry: Computer and game console peripherals
- Founded: 1990; 36 years ago, Oregon, United States
- Headquarters: Hillsboro, Oregon, United States
- Products: Steering wheel; joysticks; gamepads
- Parent: Guillemot Corporation
- Website: thrustmaster.com

Thrustmaster is an American designer, developer and manufacturer of joysticks, game controllers, and steering wheels for PCs and video gaming consoles. It has licensing agreements with third party brands including Airbus, Boeing, Ferrari, Gran Turismo, and the U.S. Air Force and it licenses some products under Sony's PlayStation and Microsoft's Xbox licenses.

== History ==
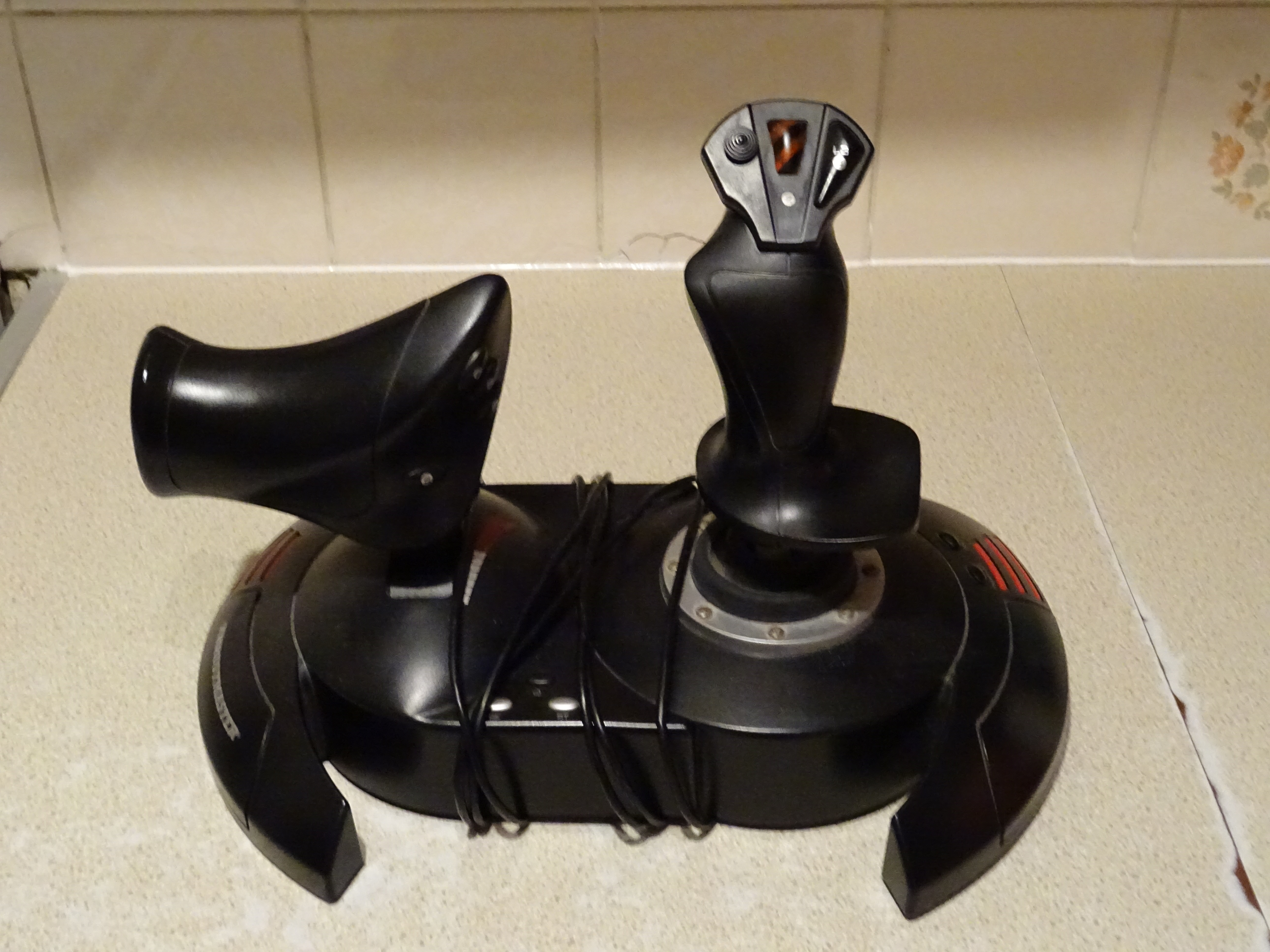
A Thrustmaster T-Flight Hotas-X from 2008

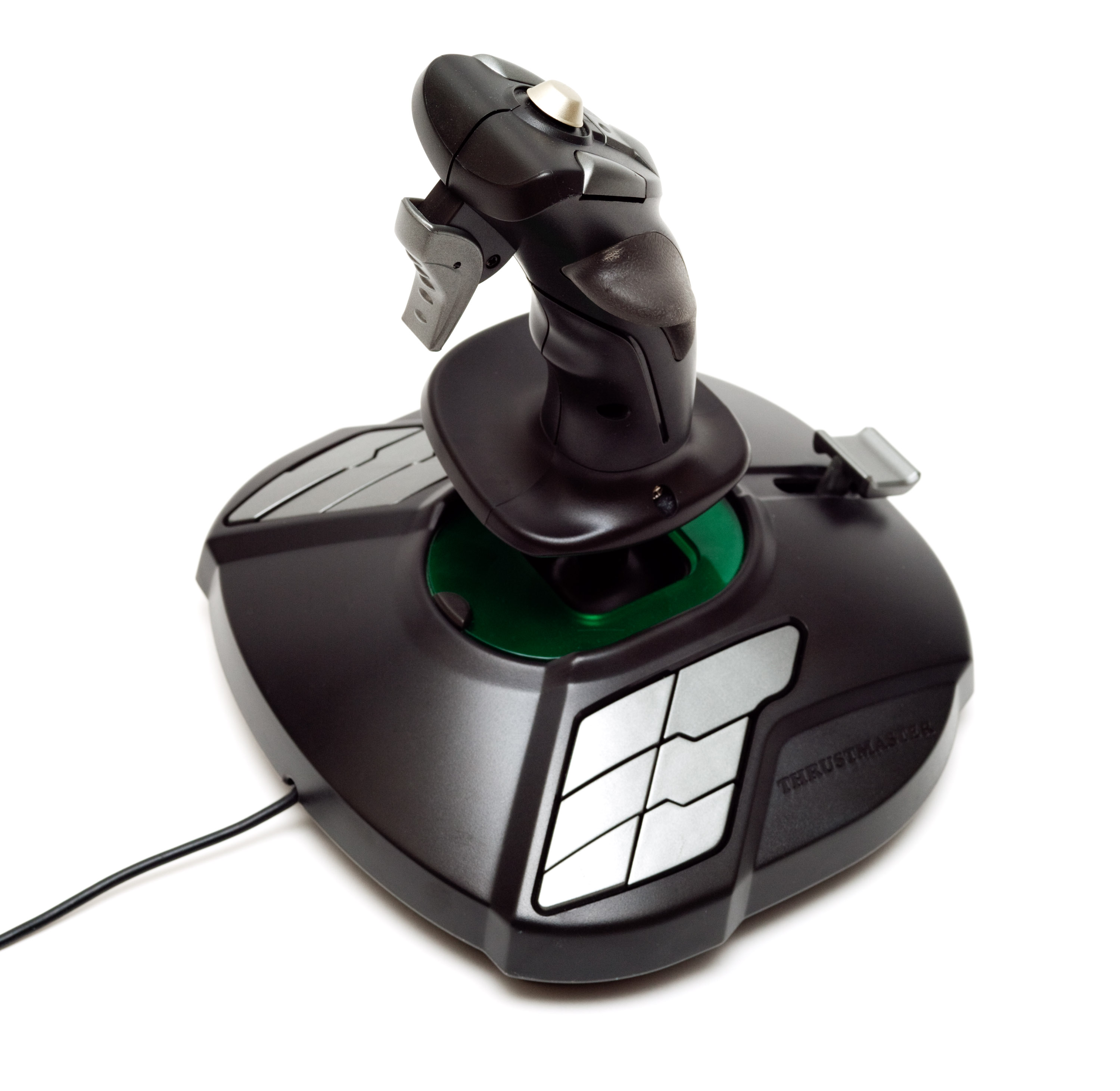
A Thrustmaster T.16000M joystick (2009)

Norm Winningstad helped found Thrustmaster in 1990 in Hillsboro, Oregon. By early 1991 the company began advertising the Thrustmaster Weapons Control System in computer magazines. It worked mainly on developing flight control for simulation on IBM Compatible Computers. The company has utilized the HOTAS system for use in computer flight simulation and has modeled some controllers after flight controls of real aircraft. The company made its name in making expensive but high-quality HOTAS controllers in the mid-1990s. By 1995, its sales grew to $15 million and then to $25 million by 1998.

In July 1999, the gaming peripherals operations and brand name was acquired from Thrustmaster for $15 million by the Guillemot Corporation Group of France (which also bought Hercules Computer Technology in 1999, merging the two businesses in a company called Hercules Thrustmaster, with headquarters in Carentoir, France, while keeping the two brands separate).

The new Thrustmaster company gradually extended the product portfolio beyond flight simulation to other simulation peripherals for PC, PlayStation and Xbox consoles:

- racing simulation as the T-GT, TS-XW, TX-RW, T300, T150, T80, TH8A gearbox, TSSH Handbrake, BT LED display, and wheels add-ons,
- gamepads as GPX, Score-A, T-Wireless, Dual Analog, eSwap, DualShock controller,
- gaming headphones as Y-C300 CPX, T.Assault Six, T.Racing Scuderia Ferrari Edition, and T.Flight U.S. Air Force Edition headset.

In 2019, Thrustmaster turnover is €59 million (US$66 million).

== HOTAS Cougar ==
Formerly one of its most expensive joysticks is the HOTAS Cougar, a close but not exact reproduction of both the throttle and stick that is used in the real F-16 block 52 fighter aircraft. The product features all-metal construction and numerous programming possibilities but is hampered by low-quality potentiometers, leading to a thriving replacement industry. Some of the devices have had reported quality problems, including play in the centering springs and the tendency of the speedbrake switch to break due to a manufacturing defect (this has been fixed on later serial numbers).

Many independent companies have produced replacement components for the Cougar to address these issues. They include redesigned gimbals which center more firmly, contactless potentiometers to replace worn originals, and even several force-controlled mods that make the stick sense pressure without moving (similar to an F-16 stick). Besides fixing complaints with the original product, these aftermarket parts have the potential to extend the life of the Cougar well past the time when Thrustmaster stops supporting it, but usually at double, even triple the price of the original purchase. However, the market for such mods tends to be limited, and many customers keep their Cougars as they came from the factory.

The HOTAS Cougar was replaced by the HOTAS Warthog in 2010, which replicates the flight controls used in the A-10 Thunderbolt II, using Hall effect sensors for the joystick and throttle axes instead of potentiometers.

== Ferrari partnership ==
In 1999, Thrustmaster made its first ever replica wheel of the Ferrari 360 Modena followed in 2002 when a wheel was inspired by seven-time world champion Michael Schumacher. After three years, Thrustmaster came out with the Enzo racing wheel. The next wheel to be released was in May 2010 when the concept of the Ferrari Wireless GT Cockpit 430 Scuderia Edition racing wheel comes out. In July of that same year the Cockpit is named "Product of the Month" and crowned "#1 Racing Wheel" for July/August by Spanish magazine Playmania.

Then in August 2011, the 458 Italia wheel is released making the first time a wheel was licensed by Microsoft. At the 2011 Italian Grand Prix in Monza, Italy, it unveiled new products under the Ferrari license. The two products were the Ferrari F1 Wheel Integral T500 and the Ferrari F1 Wheel Add-on. Later in 2011 with Ferrari they made two Thrustmaster Gamepads under the colors of the Ferrari 150th Italia. They were the F1 Wireless Gamepad Ferrari 150th Italia Alonso Edition and the F1 Dual Analog Gamepad Ferrari 150th Italia Exclusive Edition. 2013 saw the release of the TX Racing Wheel 458 Italia Edition with Brushless motors and magnetic sensors.

In 2014, came the release of the most affordable wheel to ever have an official Microsoft License at just under US$100, the Ferrari 458 Spider Racing Wheel. 2015 had the release of the T150 Ferrari Wheel Force Feedback. In 2018, the last Ferrari product with Thrustmaster at the time bundled with the T.Racing Scuderia Ferrari Edition headset and the 599xx Evo wheel, was released. In 2021, Thrustmaster unveiled a sim racing replica of the Ferrari SF1000 wheel.

== Thrustmaster Civil Aviation ==
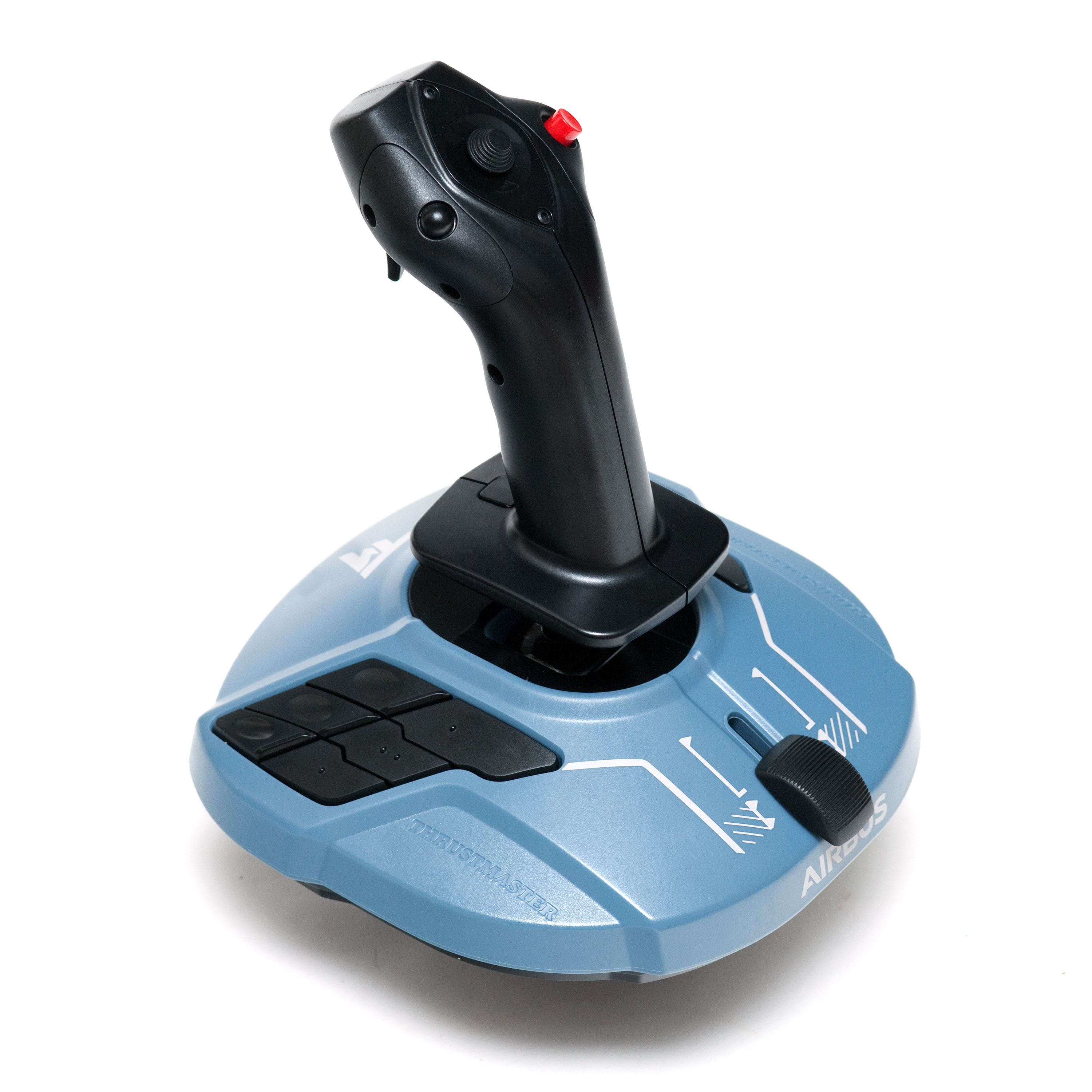
A Thrustmaster TCA Airbus Edition sidestick

In 2020, Thrustmaster launched the Thrustmaster Civil Aviation (TCA) line with the TCA Sidestick Airbus Edition, a 1:1 replica of the sidestick on an Airbus A320, followed by the miniaturized TCA Quadrant Airbus Edition, which replicates the throttle, and finally the TCA Throttle Quadrant Add-On Airbus Edition, which replicated the flaps, speed brake, landing gear, and parking brake controls, among others. The sidestick and throttle quadrant were sold together as the TCA Officer Pack Airbus Edition, and with the add-on sold as the TCA Captains Pack Airbus Edition in 2021.

In 2021, the Airbus products were followed by the TCA Yoke Pack Boeing Edition, which is a replica of the yoke on a Boeing 787 and a three-axis quadrant, which can be configured with flaps, throttle, and spoilers, which were eventually available separately.

== Hybrid racing wheels ==
The company is well known for its racing steering wheel controllers using hybrid gear and belt-driven mechanics. The type of controllers is a golden mean between the two competing technologies. In 2015 came the release of the T150 RS racing wheel with a 1080-degree angle of rotation and potentiometer sensors. The T248 racing wheel with a 1080-degree angle of rotation and magnetic sensors was released in 2021. A 3-pedal T3PM pedal unit was included with the T248 wheel kit. The T3PM unit features an adjustable brake pedal.

In 2022, came the release of the T128 racing wheel with a 900-degree angle of rotation and magnetic sensors; an entry-level 2-pedal T2PM pedal unit was included. It was created as the budget version of the T248 racing wheel. The T2PM unit is not adjustable, has a small size, but it also has two holes for hex bolts making the mounting possible.

== Direct drive wheels ==
In November 2022 came the announcement of the T818 direct-drive wheelbase, later released in early 2023. In October 2024 the T598 was announced, a mid-range direct-drive bundle, later released in November 2024.

== Products ==
=== Flying ===
Product	Price (USD)	Device
TPR Rudder	$599.99	PC
TCA Yoke Pack (Boeing)	$499.99	PC & Xbox
TCA Captain Pack (Airbus)	$299.99	PC & Xbox

=== Driving ===
Product	Price (USD)	Device	Torque (N⋅m)
T80	$109.99 - 129.99	PC, PlayStation & Xbox	n/a
T128	$199.99	PC, PlayStation & Xbox	2
T150	$189.99 - 206.99	PC & PlayStation	2
TMX	$189.99 - 206.99	PC & Xbox	2
T300 Wheelbase	$229.99	PC & PlayStation	3.9
TX Wheelbase	$229.99	PC & Xbox	3.9
T248R	$349.99	PC, PlayStation	3.1
T248	$399.99	PC, PlayStation & Xbox	3.5
TS-PC Servo Base	$399.99	PC	6
T300 RS GT Edition	$449.99	PC & PlayStation	3.9
TS-XW Servo Base	$449.99	PC & Xbox	6
T598 Direct Axial Drive	$499.99	PC & PlayStation	5-10
T-GT II Servo Base	$499.99	PC & PlayStation	6
T818 Direct Drive Base	$649.99	PC	10

== Software support ==
Linux kernel support for various steering wheel models was added in March 2021.
