= Cray APP =

Parallel computer sold by Cray Research from 1992 onwards

The Cray APP (Attached Parallel Processor) was a parallel computer sold by Cray Research from 1992 onwards. It was based on the Intel i860 microprocessor and could be configured with up to 84 processors. The design was based on "computational nodes" of 12 processors interconnected by a shared bus, with multiple nodes connected to each other, memory and I/O nodes via an 8×8 crossbar switch.

The APP was marketed as a "matrix co-processor" system and required a SPARC-based host system to operate, such as the Cray S-MP. Connection to the host system was via VMEbus or HiPPI. A fully configured APP had a peak performance of 6.7 (single-precision) gigaflops.

The APP was originally designed by FPS Computing as the FPS MCP-784. FPS were acquired by Cray Research in 1991, becoming Cray Research Superservers Inc., and the MCP-784 was relaunched by Cray in 1992 as the APP.
