= NCR/32 =

Microprocessor architecture and chipset

General information
- Marketed by: NCR Corporation

Physical specifications
- Cores: 1

The NCR/32 VLSI Processor family was a 32-bit microprocessor architecture and chipset developed by NCR Corporation in the early 1980s. Generally used in minicomputer systems, it was noteworthy for being externally microprogrammable.

== History ==
NCR announced the release of its NCR/32 architecture, comprising an initial four-chip set, in the third quarter of 1982. The Central Processor Chip included an external microcode bus that let a designer create custom instructions for specific applications.

This feature was used to develop microcode that allowed the NCR/32 to emulate NCR's earlier mainframe computers, or an IBM System/370.

The design also enabled high-level languages, such as Prolog and polyFORTH, to be executed directly from custom instructions in the external microcontrol store.

Both the NCR/32 processor and some products that used it have been called reduced instruction set computer (RISC) systems, although the description has been debated; the original Berkeley RISC and Stanford MIPS research programs did not complete until 1984, and avoiding the use of microcode was one of the key RISC design principles.

NCR used the processor architecture in certain models of their own computer systems, communications peripherals, and at least one board-level product.

Some of the designers of the NCR/32 left NCR for a new company, Celerity Computing, which used the NCR/32 in its own minicomputer designs, running a version of the University of California at Berkeley's Unix Release 4.2.

== Chipset ==
The chipset for the NCR/32 family includes the following devices:

- NCR/32-000 Central Processor Chip (CPC)
- NCR/32-010 Address Translation Chip (ATC)
- NCR/32-020 Extended Arithmetic Chip (EAC)
- NCR/32-500 System Interface Controller (SIC)
- NCR/32-580 System Interface Transmitter (SIT)
- NCR/32-590 System Interface Receiver (SIR)

== Features ==
The NCR/32-000 CPC was the cornerstone of the architecture; all of the other devices were optional. The CPC consists of 40,000 transistors, and was originally fabricated in a 3 micron NMOS process. The device supports two levels of microcode: vertical microcode, stored in an external 128K-byte Instruction Storage Unit (ISU), and horizontal microcode, stored in an internal Read-only memory (ROM) encoding 179 operations in a set of 95-bit wide words. The CPC accesses the ISU over a 16-bit wide Instruction Storage Unit Bus (ISUBUS), feeding a 3-stage microinstruction pipeline. Internally, the CPC has a 32-bit wide Arithmetic Logic Unit (ALU), and 16 32-bit general purpose registers. The processor can address up to 4 GB of direct virtual memory, and 16 MB of direct real memory over a 32-bit wide Processor Memory Bus (PMBUS). The base clock frequency of the CPC is 13.3 MHz. With its two-phase, non-overlapping clock, each machine cycle takes two "ticks", yielding a cycle time of 150 nanoseconds (nS). 90% of the CPC's microinstructions complete in a single cycle.

A revised version of the CPC was released later, with device geometry reduced from 3 to 2 microns Cycle time on higher-performance NCR 10000 systems was down to 110 nS.

The NCR/32-010 ATC provides advanced memory management services such as address translation, access protection, memory-refresh control, and error-checking and correction (ECC). It contains sixteen translation registers which handle mapping of 32-bit or 24-bit virtual addresses into 24-bit physical addresses, with page sizes of 1K, 2K, or 4K bytes.

The NCR/32-020 EAC accelerates the execution of arithmetic operations, performing IBM-compatible single- and double-precision binary and floating-point arithmetic, packed and unpacked decimal storage, and format conversions.

The NCR/32-500 SIC interfaces the PMBUS to slower peripherals and other systems. The NCR/32-580 SIT and NCR/32-590 SIR perform data format conversions. The SIC/SIT/SIR combination can operate in one of two modes: Data Link Control or Local Area Network.

== Applications ==
- NCR 9300 system.
- NCR 9400 system.
- NCR 9800 system.
- NCR System 10000. Offering the Model 35, Model 55, Model 65, and Model 75 on release. The Model 85 was released in early 1990.
- NCR/32-796A Multibus single-board computer (SBC).
- NCR Comten 5620 communications processor.
- Celerity Computing used NCR/32 chips in various models, including their debut C1200, as part of their ACCEL architecture.
- Honeywell signed an agreement with NCR to use the NCR/32 in its next-generation minicomputer, possibly the DPS-4.
