= Cray S-MP =

The Cray S-MP was a multiprocessor server computer sold by Cray Research from 1992 to 1993. It was based on the Sun SPARC microprocessor architecture and could be configured with up to eight 66 MHz BIT B5000 processors. Optionally, a Cray APP matrix co-processor cluster could be added to an S-MP system.

The S-MP was originally designed by FPS Computing as the FPS Model 500EA. FPS were acquired by Cray Research in 1991, becoming Cray Research Superservers Inc., and the Model 500EA was relaunched by Cray in 1992 as the S-MP.

The S-MP was a short-lived model, and was superseded by the Cray CS6400.
