= Norm Winningstad =

American engineer and businessman

- Winningstad in 2008
- Born: C. Norman Winningstad; November 5, 1925; Berkeley, California, U.S.
- Died: November 24, 2010 (aged 85); Newport, Oregon, U.S.
- Education: University of California, Berkeley; Portland State University
- Occupations: Entrepreneur, engineer
- Children: 3

C. Norman (Norm) Winningstad (November 5, 1925 – November 24, 2010) was an American engineer and businessman in the state of Oregon. A native of California, he served in the U.S. Navy during World War II before working at what is now Lawrence Berkeley National Laboratory. After moving north to Oregon, he started working for Tektronix before starting several companies in what became the Silicon Forest in the Portland metropolitan area. He founded or helped to found Floating Point Systems, Lattice Semiconductor, and Thrustmaster. Winningstad and his wife were also noted philanthropists in the Portland area, with a theater at the Portland Center for the Performing Arts named in his wife Dolores' honor.

== Early life ==
C. Norman Winningstad was born in Berkeley, California, to Chester and Phyllis Winningstad on November 5, 1925. He grew up in California and then served in the United States Navy during World War II as an electronic technician's mate. After the war Winningstad continued in the electronics field when graduated from the University of California, Berkeley with a degree in electrical engineering.

He graduated in 1948 as an expert in vacuum tubes, which was the same year Bell Labs developed the transistor. As the transistor would replace vacuum tubes in most applications, Winningstad later joked that he "graduated technically obsolete". He then worked at the Lawrence Radiation Laboratory in his hometown for a few years. He was married to Dolores, and they had two sons, Richard and Dennis, along with a daughter Joanne.

== Oregon ==
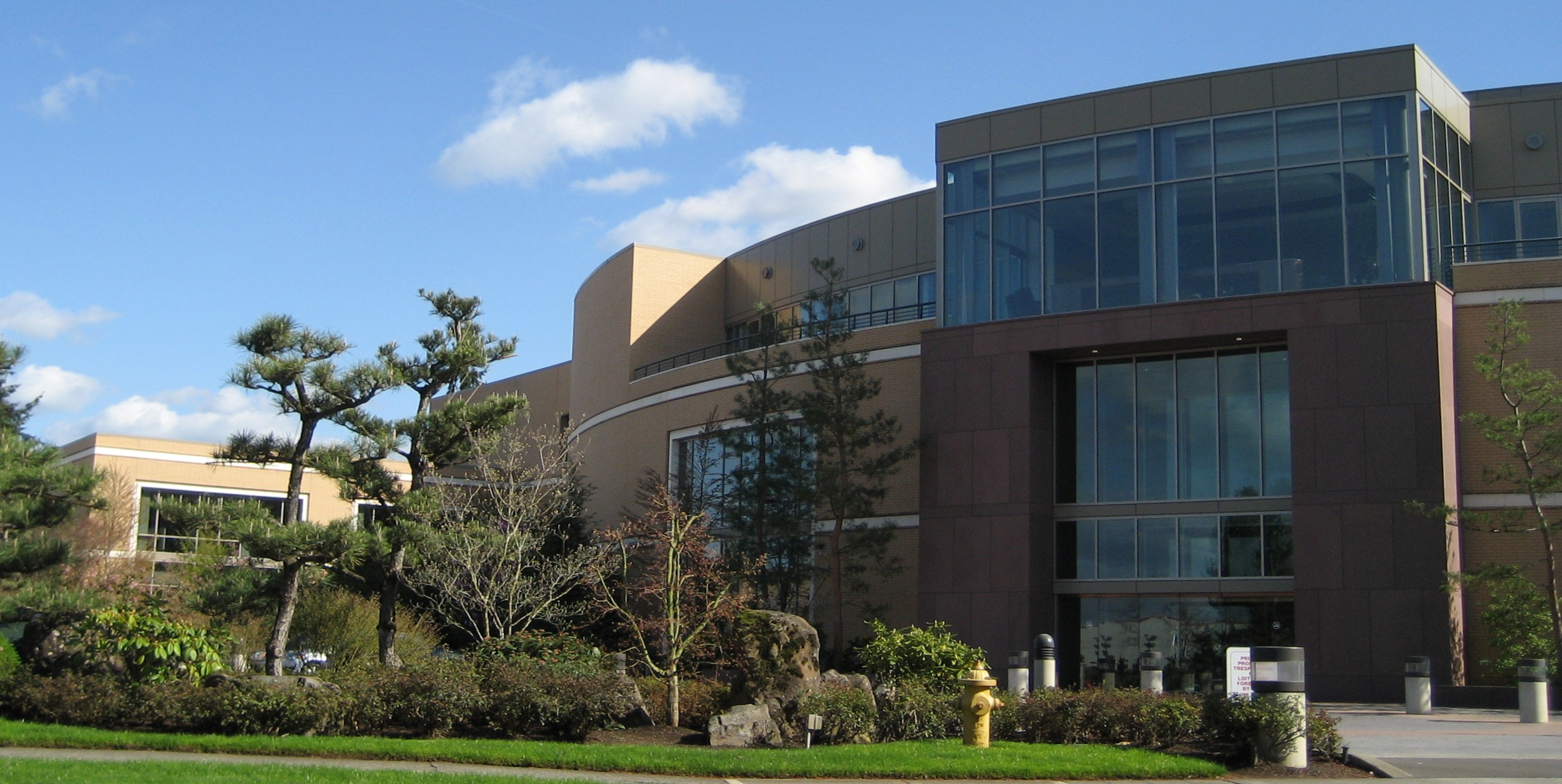
Lattice Semiconductor's headquarters

Winningstad moved north to Oregon in 1958, settling in the Portland metropolitan area. There he worked for technology company Tektronix (Tek), near the city of Beaverton. While with Tek, he was later described as "one of its leading brains during its 1960s heyday". Tek manufactured oscilloscopes, and later diversified into areas such as printers and even television production equipment. Winningstad continued his education with a degree from Portland State University.

He left Tektronix in 1970 to help start supercomputer company Floating Point Systems in Beaverton. At his new company, he received assistance from his old company in the way of simulations and early production of prototypes. Winningstad grew the company to 1,600 employees and annual revenues of $127 million, though he left and came back to resurrect the company before Floating Point went bankrupt in the early 1990s.

Winningstad continued his entrepreneurial ways by helping to found Lattice Semiconductor in Hillsboro in 1980 and Thrustmaster in 1990, also in Hillsboro. These, Floating Point Systems, and Tek helped create the Silicon Forest, which Lattice trademarked in the 1980s.

In 1985, he was a supporter of a proposed sales tax, which ultimately failed. He moved to the Oregon Coast in 1989, settling in Newport. He maintained a home in the Portland area, and flew his helicopter between his homes. His business ventures provided him with the wealth to own the helicopter, and at one time four Ferraris.

== Later years and death ==
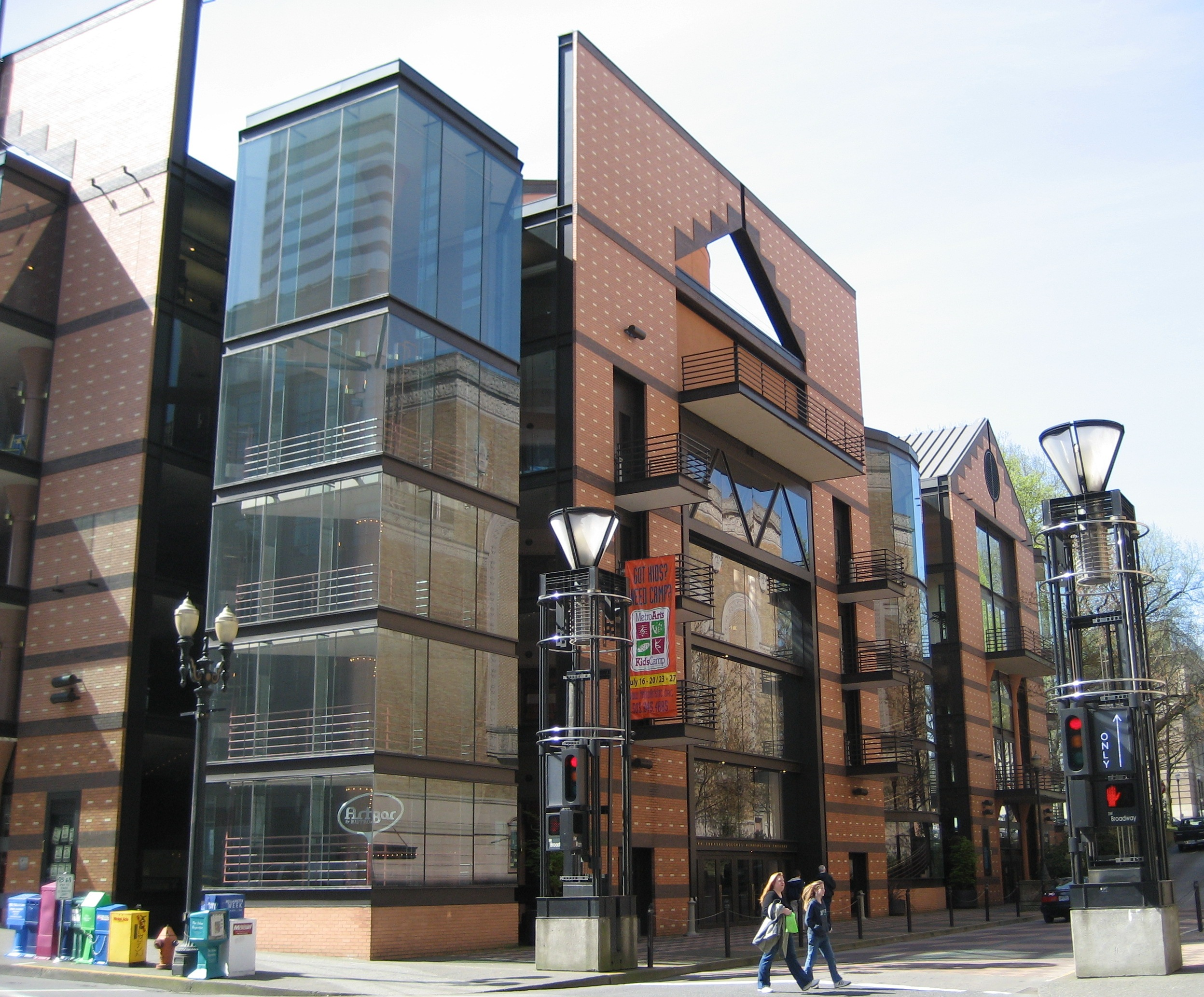
Portland Center for Performing Arts's Antoinette Hatfield Hall, which includes the Dolores Winningstad Theatre

He wrote The Area of Enlightenment: "Don't Confuse Me with the Facts, I've Already Made up my Mind" with ghostwriter Carla Perry, which was published in 2005. Winningstad, as a veteran himself, was a supporter of veterans and would attend memorial services to show his support. He also supported cultural institutions in the Portland area, such as the Washington County Museum, the Oregon Symphony Orchestra, and the Portland Center for the Performing Arts, which includes the Dolores Winningstad Theater, named after his wife.

On November 24, 2010, Norm Winningstad died from a self-inflicted gunshot wound at the age of 85. He killed himself at his home in Newport after suffering from an undisclosed illness that had caused him great physical pain. Winningstad had started a company near his death to develop one of his last technologies. The technology was a product to record police interactions after they pulled someone over.
