= Sun Fire T2000 =

Sun Microsystems compute server

The Sun Fire T2000 server (code named Ontario) is a system engineered by Sun Microsystems for applications including Web 2.0 and databaseing. Part of the Sun Fire line, the T2000 was among the first servers to leverage Sun's CoolThreads processing technology, which improves the energy-efficiency of systems.

Introduced in December 2005, the Sun T2000 reached its end of life (EOL) in November 2009.

== Hardware ==
The T2000 is powered by a four-core, six-core or eight-core UltraSPARC T1 processor, supports up to 64 GiB of ECC DDR2 SDRAM system memory using 16 DIMM slots, and up to 584 gigabytes of internal storage with Serial attached SCSI drives. InfoWorld noted that the system is light for its class. It is 3.5 inches tall, 16.7 inches wide, 24.4 inches deep and weighs 40 pounds.

== Operating Systems ==
The T2000 was offered by Sun preloaded with the Solaris 10 operating system.
