= Sun Enterprise =

Sun Microsystems range of computers

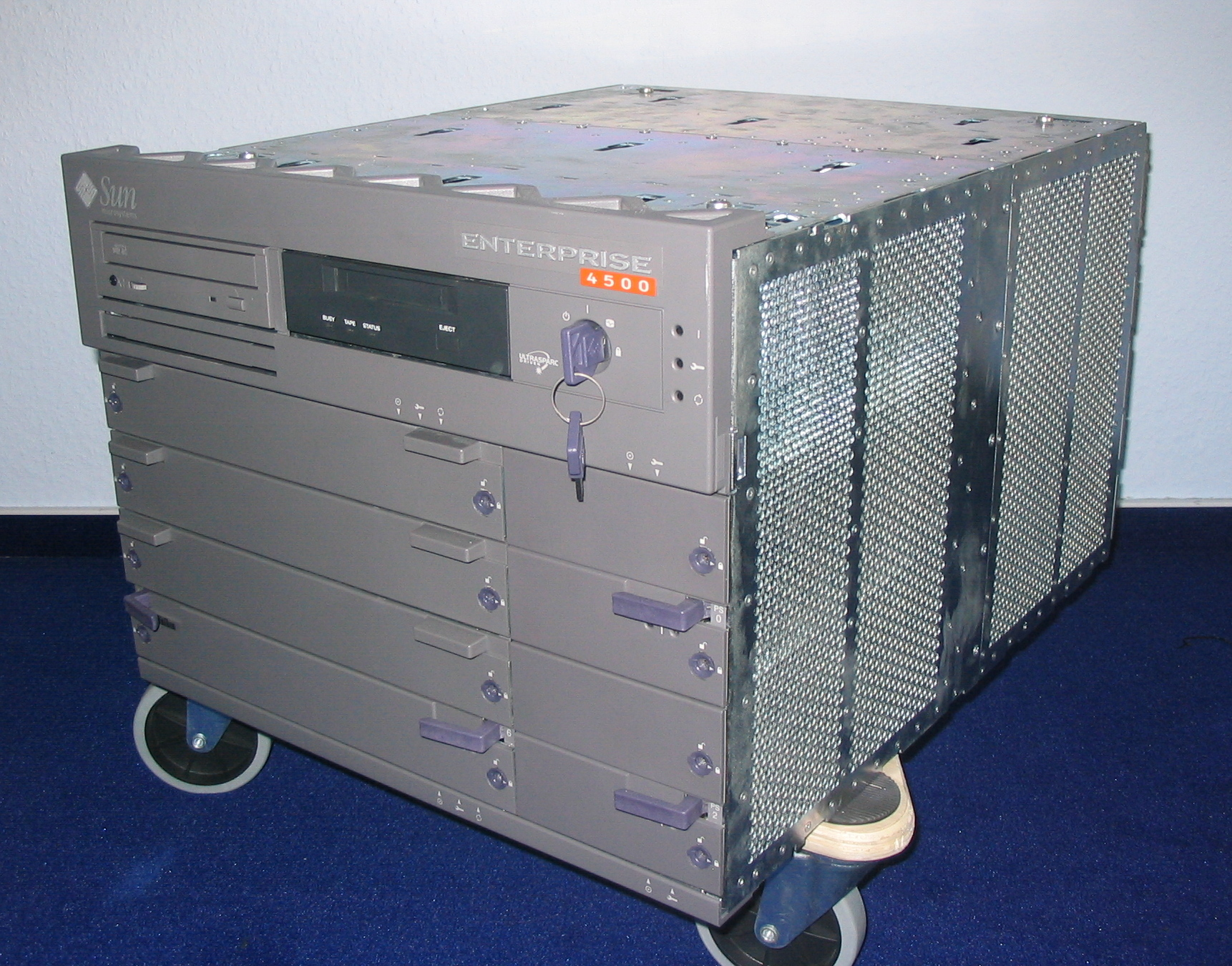
Sun Enterprise 4500 Server

Sun Enterprise is a range of UNIX server computers produced by Sun Microsystems from 1996 to 2001. The line was launched as the Sun Ultra Enterprise series; the Ultra prefix was dropped around 1998. These systems are based on the 64-bit UltraSPARC microprocessor architecture and related to the contemporary Ultra series of computer workstations. Like the Ultra series, they run Solaris. Various models, from single-processor entry-level servers to large high-end multiprocessor servers were produced. The Enterprise brand was phased out in favor of the Sun Fire model line from 2001 onwards.

== Ultra workstation-derived servers ==
The first UltraSPARC-I-based servers produced by Sun, launched in 1995, are the UltraServer 1 and UltraServer 2. These are server configurations of the Ultra 1 and Ultra 2 workstations respectively. These were later renamed Ultra Enterprise 1 and Ultra Enterprise 2 for consistency with other server models. Later these were joined by the Ultra Enterprise 150, which comprises an Ultra 1 motherboard in a tower-style enclosure with 12 internal disk bays.

In 1998, Sun launched server configurations of the UltraSPARC-IIi-based Ultra 5 and Ultra 10 workstations, called the Enterprise Ultra 5S and Enterprise Ultra 10S respectively.

== Entry-level servers ==
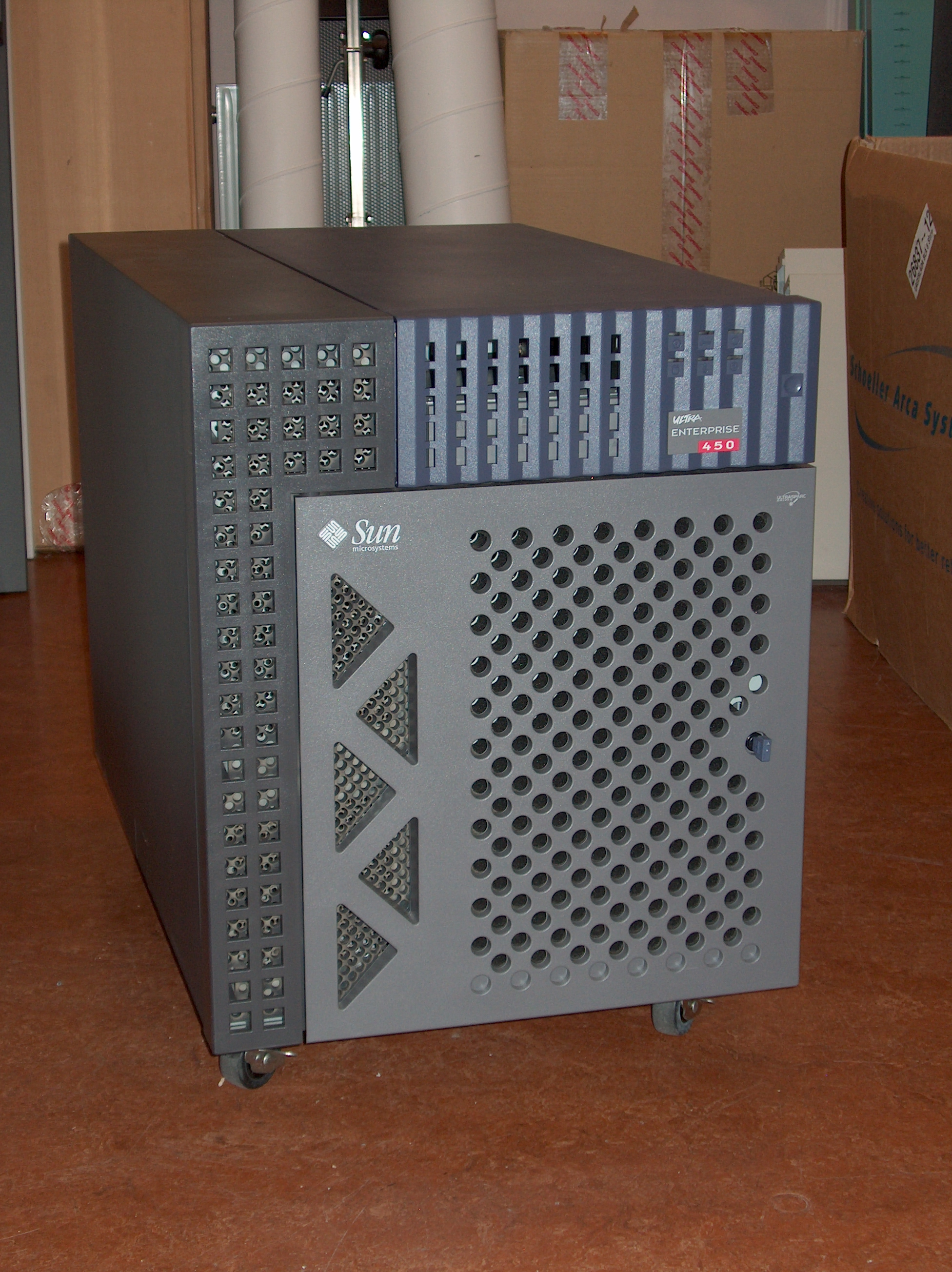
Ultra Enterprise 450

The Sun Enterprise 450 is a rack-mountable entry-level multiprocessor server launched in 1997, capable of up to four UltraSPARC II processors. The Sun Enterprise 250 is a two-processor version launched in 1998. These were later joined by the Enterprise 220R and Enterprise 420R rack-mount servers in 1999. The 220R and 420R models are respectively based on the motherboards of the Ultra 60 and Ultra 80 workstations. The 250 was replaced by the Sun Fire V250, the 450 by the Sun Fire V880. The 220R was superseded by the Sun Fire 280R and the 420R by the Sun Fire V480.

== Ultra Enterprise XX00 mid-range servers ==
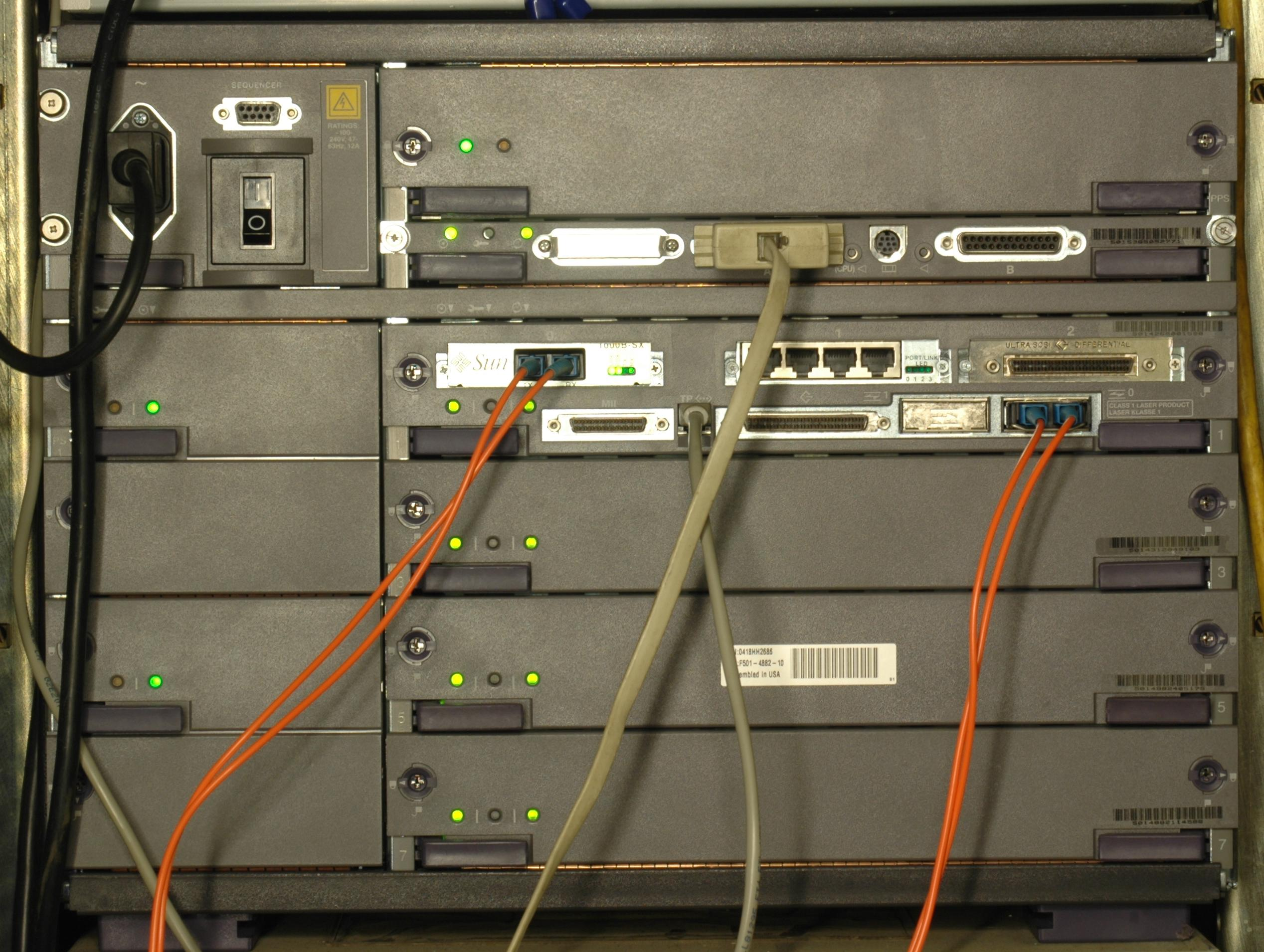
Ultra Enterprise 4000, rear

In 1996, Sun replaced the SPARCserver 1000E and SPARCcenter 2000E models with the Ultra Enterprise 3000, 4000, 5000 and 6000 servers. These are multiprocessor servers based on a common hardware architecture incorporating the Gigaplane packet-switched processor/memory bus and UltraSPARC-I or II processors. High availability and fault-tolerance features are included in the X000 systems which are intended for mission-critical applications.

The 3000 model is a deskside server configurable with up to six processors and 10 internal disks, while the 4000 is a rack-mount system with up to 14 processors. The 5000 is essentially a 4000 in a rack cabinet and the 6000 is a cabinet-housed data center server with up to 30 processors.

In 1999, the Enterprise 3500, 4500, 5500 and 6500 models were announced. These are upgraded X000 systems, with a faster Gigaplane bus (up to 100 MHz, depending on processor clock speed, compared to 83 MHz). The 3500 also differs from the 3000 by having an additional Gigaplane slot resulting in an increased maximum of eight processors. The Enterprise X500 series were replaced by the Sun Fire 3800/4800/6800 line.

== Enterprise 10000 ==
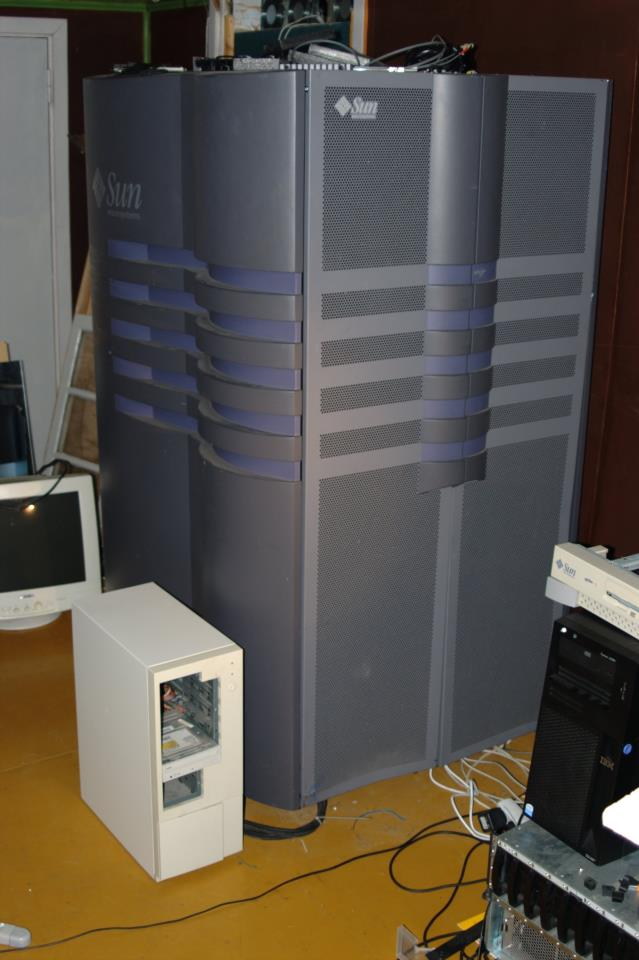
Sun Starfire 10000

The Enterprise 10000, E10k or Starfire (a development code name also used for marketing purposes) is a high-end multiprocessor data center server capable of being configured with up to 64 UltraSPARC II processors. This was largely designed by Cray Research's Business Systems Division as a successor to the Cray Superserver 6400, itself related to Sun's earlier Sun-4d architecture servers. After Cray was acquired by Silicon Graphics in 1996, this division was sold on to Sun, who then launched the Starfire as the Ultra Enterprise 10000 in 1997.

The Starfire is based around the fault-tolerant Gigaplane-XB processor/memory interconnect. Like the X000 and X500 series servers, the Starfire incorporates many high-availability features, including the ability to be partitioned into multiple "domains", each of which can be booted individually to run its own instance of Solaris. It is also possible to remove resources from a running domain with short notice and reassign freed resources to other domains. Domain granularity is one CPU board (single system may have 1-16 of them). A single CPU board can carry up to 4 processors, 4GB of RAM and 4 SBUS IO boards. A rare option is to replace 4 SBUS boards with dual PCI boards. The Starfire is the first server from any vendor to exceed 2000 on the TPC-D 300 GB benchmark. Starfire systems were used by a number of high-profile customers during the "dot-com" boom, notably eBay, and typically sold for well over $1 million for a fully configured system.

The Starfire contains one or two controller modules which are connected via Ethernet to an external computer, the System Service Processor (SSP). The controller modules interface with the system "centerplane" via JTAG and control the partitioning of available CPUs, memory and I/O devices into one or more domains, each of which is in effect a distinct computer. The system cannot be partitioned or booted without its original SSP which contains encrypted keys issued by the manufacturer. An E10K has been preserved at the Computer History Museum in Mountain View.

The Starfire (E10k) was superseded by the Sun Fire 12k / 15K / E25K models.
