= Sun Fire 15K =

Server computer from Sun Microsystems

The Sun Fire 15K (codenamed Starcat) was an enterprise-class server computer from Sun Microsystems based on the SPARC V9 processor architecture. It was announced on September 25, 2001, in New York City, superseding the Sun Enterprise 10000. General availability was in January 2002; the last to be shipped was in May 2005.

The Sun Fire 15K supported up to 106 UltraSPARC III processors (up to 1.2 GHz), or 72 UltraSPARC IVs (up to 1.35 GHz & 288 total threads) across 18 system boards (Uniboards, containing CPU sockets and RAM slots). With the UltraSPARC III, Sun supported up to 17 dual-socket "MaxCPU" processor cards in place of I/O mezzanine cards, a configuration not supported with UltraSPARC IV. Maximum physical RAM per system is 576 GB. A maximum of 72 PCI I/O slots are available.

The system can be divided into a maximum of 18 secure independent domains, each of which is a separate machine with its own filesystems, root password and the ability to run different versions of Solaris. The E15k, along with other enterprise Sun servers, has the Dynamic Reconfiguration feature: administrators could dynamically change the assignment of RAM and processors to the different domains to meet changes in business needs. In addition, the 15K contains two system controllers (duplicated for redundancy), which are embedded SPARC computers running Solaris and used to manage the 15K and perform tasks such as booting and shutting down domains and assigning Uniboards to domains. The 15K contains minimal storage in itself (only system controller boot disks); it is connected via SAN to a separate storage array.

== Sun Fire 12K ==
The Sun Fire 12K (codenamed Starkitty), was a reduced configuration version of the 15K, introduced in April 2002. It supported a maximum of 52 processors, and was intended to fill a position in Sun's server product line between the 15K and the Sun Fire 6800.

== Sun Fire E25K ==
The Sun Fire E25K (codenamed Amazon 25; the "E" denoting "Enterprise") was announced in February 2004. Its base cabinet is identical to the 15K, with the only difference between the two systems being the processor boards installed. It reached end-of-life in January, 2009, and was superseded by the Sun SPARC Enterprise M9000 server.

The E25K supports up to 72 dual-core UltraSPARC IV+ processors (up to 1.95 GHz). As with UltraSPARC IV-based 15K systems, the "MaxCPU" option was not offered for E25K systems. Overall system bandwidth is claimed as up to 172.8 GB/s aggregate, up to 115.2 GB/s peak, and up to 43.2 GB/s sustained. For overall I/O bandwidth, up to 35.8-GB/s sustained. Up to 64 GB of RAM per board is possible with a maximum of 1.15 TB of RAM for a single domain. Up to 72 hot swappable PCI-X I/O slots; 54 slots are 90 MHz, 18 slots are 33 MHz. It also supports 10/100 BaseT Ethernet, Gigabit Ethernet, UltraSCSI (LVD and HVD), ATM, FC-AL, HSI and SCI.

They were replaced by SPARC-T and M series
