= SPARCstation IPC =

1990 workstation by Sun Microsystems

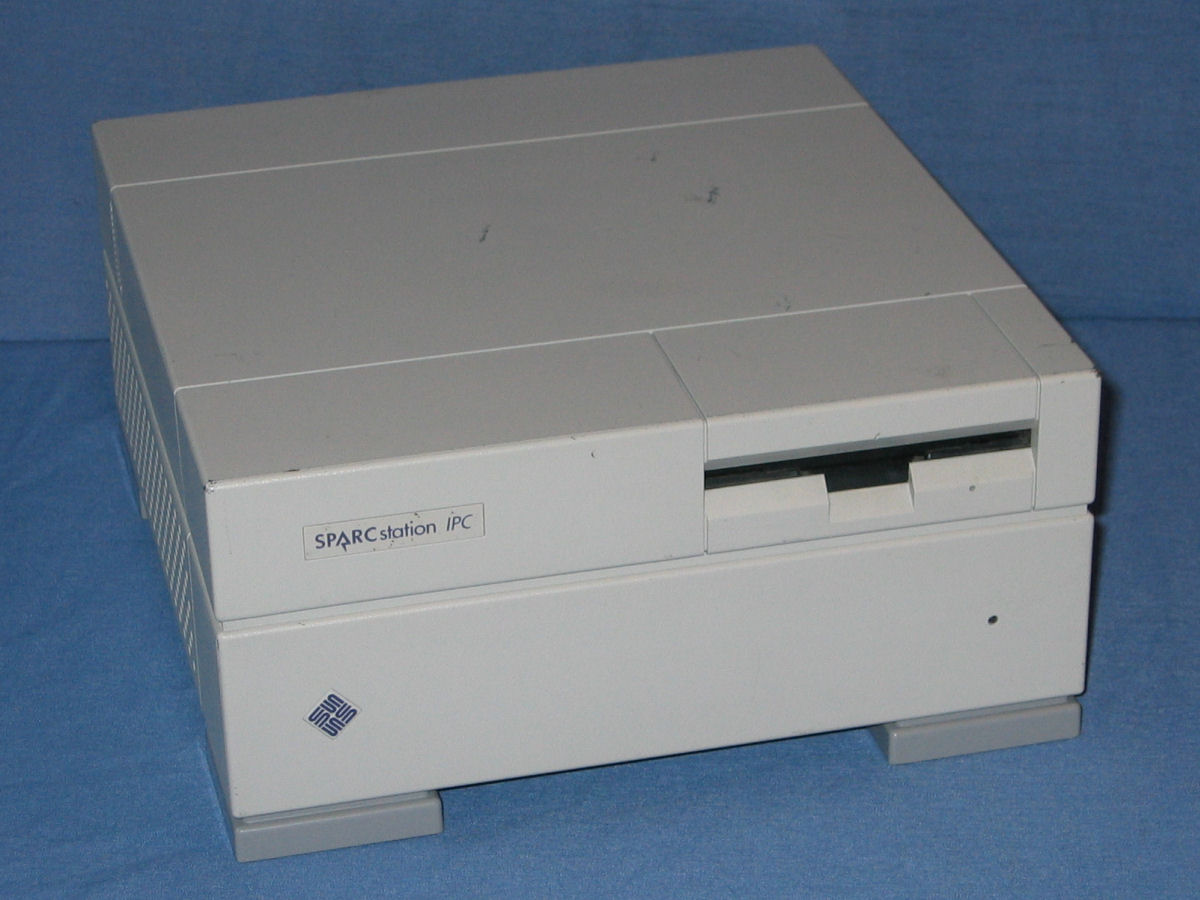
- Codename: Phoenix
- Also known as: 4/40
- Developer: Sun Microsystems
- Manufacturer: Sun Microsystems
- Product family: SPARCstation
- Type: Workstation
- Released: July 25, 1990
- Availability: July 25, 1990
- Introductory price: US$8,995–9,995
- Operating system: SunOS; Solaris
- CPU: Fujitsu MB86901A or LSI L64801 (SPARC) at 25 MHz
- Memory: 1–48 MB
- Successor: SPARCstation IPX
- Related: SPARCstation 1+

The SPARCstation IPC (Sun 4/40, code-named Phoenix) is a workstation sold by Sun Microsystems, introduced July 25, 1990. It is based on the sun4c architecture, and is enclosed in a lunchbox chassis. Intended as an inexpensive alternative to the mainstream SPARCstation 1+, it sold for US$8,995 as a diskless node and for US$9,995 with a 207-MB hard drive (equivalent to $22,167–24,631 in 2025). The SPARCstation IPC was the top-selling Unix workstation for the first quarter of 1991, according to Dataquest, sliding to the number-two slot the following quarter (behind the SPARCstation 2).

== Specifications ==
=== CPU support ===
The SPARCstation IPC incorporates a 25 MHz Fujitsu MB86901A or LSI L64801 processor. The SPARCstation IPC is limited to use as a single-processor machine.

=== Memory ===
The SPARCstation IPC has twelve SIMM memory slots, in three 4-slot groups. Each group of four slots can be filled with either four 1 MB SIMMs or four 4 MB SIMMs, for a maximum of 48 MB.

=== Disk drives ===
The SPARCstation IPC can hold one internal 3.5", 50-pin, single-ended, fast-narrow SE SCSI disk drive and a 3.5" 1.44 MB floppy drive. Both are mounted in the top cover of the case. The hard disk slot supports higher drives than the 1 inch format that became standard later. It also supports external SCSI devices. There is no IDE/ATAPI support. Modern 80-pin SCA drives can work with an adapter, but do not fit inside the case due to the size of the adapter.

=== Interfaces ===
The SPARCstation IPC has the following interfaces:

- SCSI
- Ethernet (15-pin Attachment Unit Interface connector)
- Two RS-232/RS-423 serial ports: 8-pin mini-DIN connectors (DB-25 adapter cables are provided)
- Video: DB13W3 connector for integrated bwtwo monochrome framebuffer
- Keyboard/mouse: one 8-pin mini-DIN connector
- Audio: one 8-pin mini-DIN connector
- Two SBus slots

=== Network support ===
The SPARCstation IPC comes with an on-board AMD Lance Ethernet chipset and a 15-pin AUI connector, which can connect to 10BASE2, 10BASE5 or 10BASE-T via an appropriate transceiver. The OpenBoot ROM is able to boot from network, using RARP and TFTP. Like all other SPARCstation systems, the IPC holds system information such as MAC address and serial number in NVRAM. If the battery on this chip dies, then the system will not be able to boot without manual intervention (keyboard entry of boot parameters).

== NVRAM ==
The SPARCstation IPC uses an M48T02 battery-backed RTC with RAM chip which handles the real time clock and boot parameter storage. An issue with this chip is that the battery is internal, which means the entire chip must be replaced when its battery runs out. As all SPARCstation IPCs made are now older than the battery life of this chip, a substantial number of these systems now refuse to boot. Additionally, the SPARCstation IPC design used the reserved bits in the M48T02's NVRAM in a non-standard way; since later revisions of the M48T02 chip exert stricter control over these bits, a current M48T02 will store the NVRAM data, but the RTC will not function correctly and the system may fail to auto-boot.

Due to incompatibilities with modern M48T02s, it is common to modify failed NVRAMs by cutting into the encapsulation and patching in a new battery. It is also possible to replace the entire encapsulation, which also contains a 32.768 kHz clock crystal.

== Operating systems ==
The following operating systems will run on a SPARCstation IPC:

- SunOS 4.0.3c onwards
- Solaris 2.0 to Solaris 7
- Linux – Some but not all distributions still support this SPARC32 sub-architecture
- NetBSD/sparc32 since 1.0
- OpenBSD/sparc32 - All versions up to 5.9 (OpenBSD 5.9 was the last release to support SPARC32)

== Related computers ==
The SPARCstation 1+ (Sun 4/65) is architecturally very similar but housed in a pizza box form factor.

The SPARCstation IPX (Sun 4/50) is a later lunchbox form factor system.
