= SPARCstation IPX =

Workstation made by Sun Microsystems

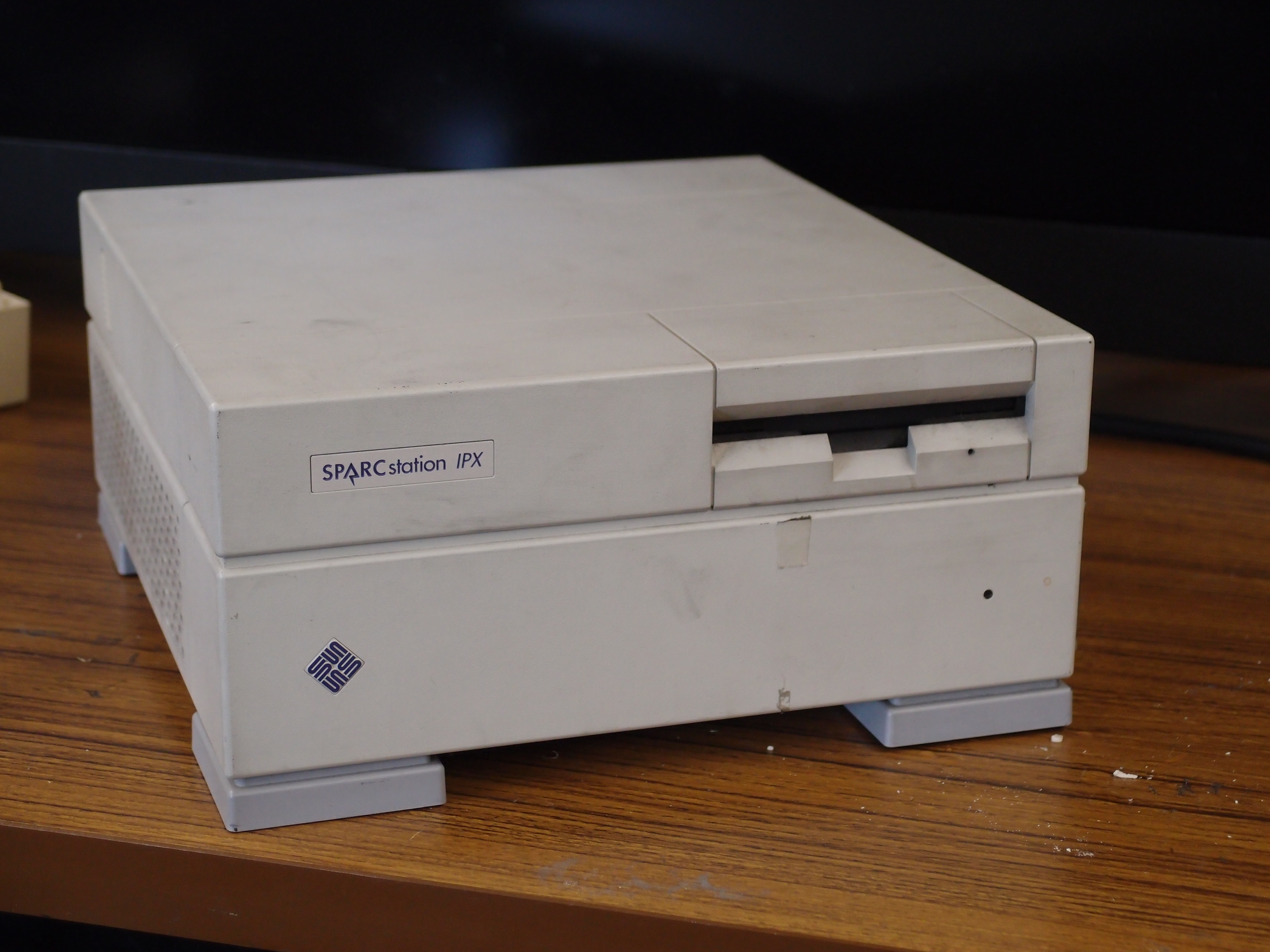
- Codename: Hobbes
- Also known as: 4/50
- Developer: Sun Microsystems
- Manufacturer: Sun Microsystems
- Product family: SPARCstation
- Type: Workstation
- Released: July 22, 1991
- Availability: July 22, 1991
- Introductory price: US$11,995–13,495
- Operating system: SunOS; Solaris
- CPU: Fujitsu MB86903 or Weitek W8701 (SPARC) at 40 MHz; or Weitek "SPARC POWER μP" 2000A-80-GCD at 80 MHz
- Memory: 1–64 MB
- Predecessor: SPARCstation IPC
- Related: SPARCstation 2

The SPARCstation IPX (Sun 4/50, code-named Hobbes) is a workstation that was sold by Sun Microsystems. The successor to the SPARCstation IPC, Sun introduced the SPARCstation IPX on July 22, 1991. It is based on the sun4c architecture, and is enclosed in a lunchbox chassis. Intended as a mid-range offering in their SPARCstation line of workstations, the SPARCstation IPX sold for US$11,995 at the low end and US$13,495 at the high end (equivalent to $28,354–31,899 in 2025). It was among top three best-selling Unix workstations of 1991.

== Specifications ==
=== CPU support ===
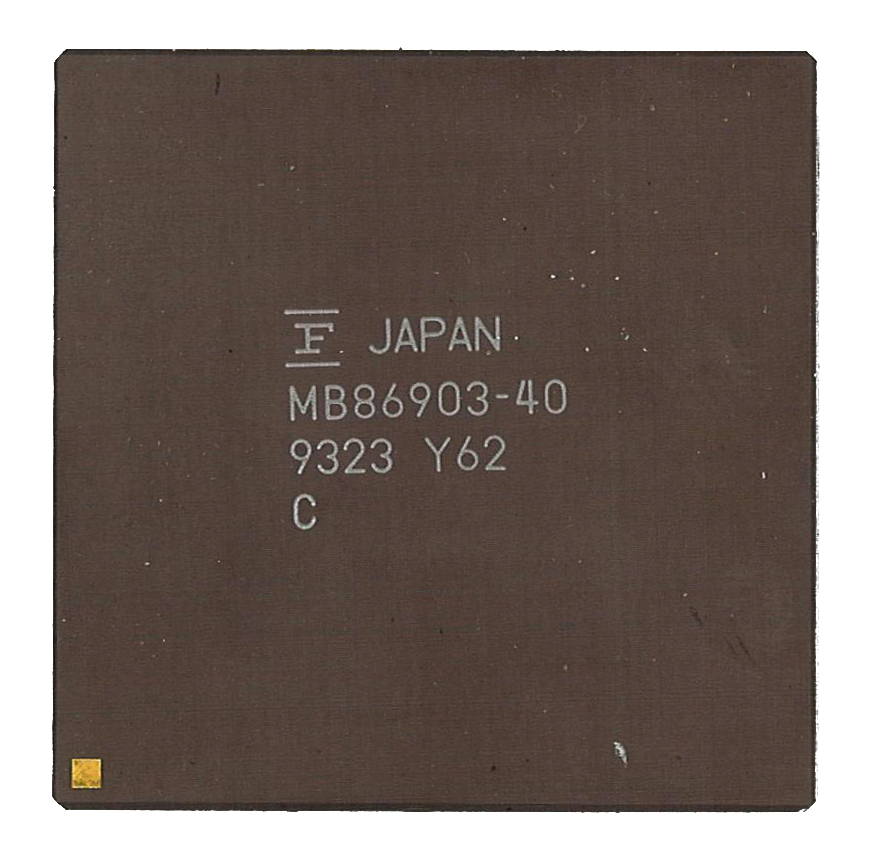
Fujitsu-MB86903-40

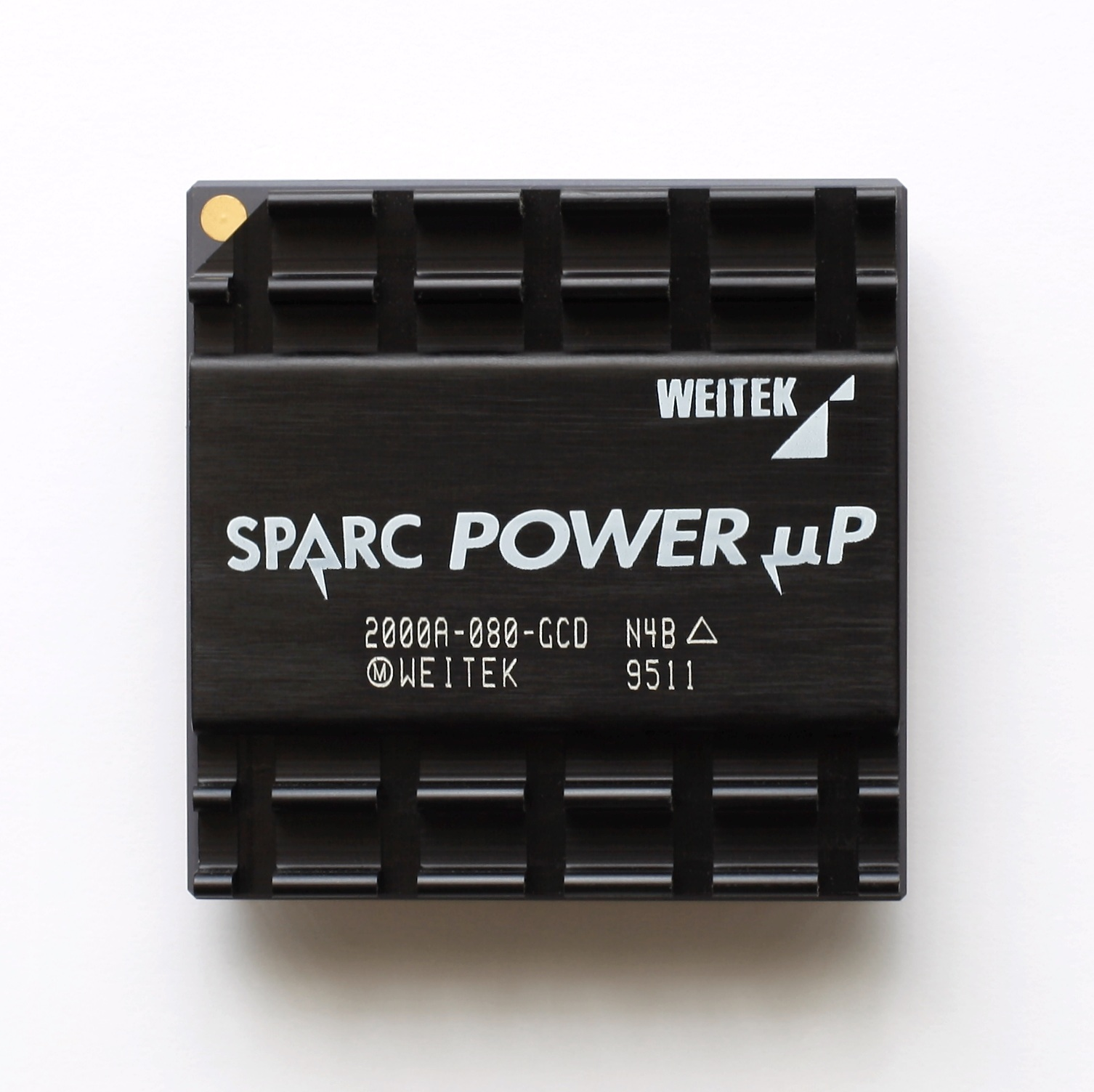
Weitek SPARC Power μP

The SPARCstation IPX incorporates a 40 MHz Fujitsu MB86903 or Weitek W8701 processor. Weitek sold an 80 MHz aftermarket "SPARC POWER μP" (2000A-080 GCD) processor for the IPX, which requires a ROM update to v2.9.

=== Memory ===
The SPARCstation IPX has four 72-pin SIMM slots for memory expansion. The memory uses parity Fast Page Memory (FPM) SIMM's with speeds of 50-80 ns. Slots can be filled individually giving a maximum of 64 MB memory. Paired memory modules decrease access times via "bank interleaving" resulting in faster memory and overall system performance. Additional 32 and 64 MB SBus "Above Board" RAM expanders will fit and work with the IPX using the 8-pin J101 header which contains additional power and clock signals next to the DMA/Cache controller.

=== Disk drives ===
The SPARCstation IPX can hold one internal 50-pin IDC SCSI drive and a floppy drive. It also supports external SCSI devices. There is no IDE/ATAPI support. Modern 80-pin SCA drives can work with an adapter, but do not fit inside the case due to the size of the adapter.

=== Network support ===
The SPARCstation IPX comes with an on-board AMD Lance Ethernet chipset, which provides an AUI connection. External AUI transceivers are required for connection to 10BASE5, 10BASE2, 10BASE-T, or other Ethernet physical layer media. The OpenBoot ROM is able to boot from network, using RARP and TFTP. Like all other SPARCstation systems, the IPX holds system information such as MAC address and serial number in NVRAM. If the battery on this chip dies, then the system will not be able to boot unaided. (The boot parameters can be entered manually, but will be lost on power off.)

=== Integrated Framebuffer ===
The SPARCstation IPX includes an integrated Sun Turbo GX cgsix color framebuffer on the internal SBus. This frees one SBus slot from framebuffer duty, which makes the SPARCstation IPX as expandable as the larger form factor SPARCstation 2, with which it otherwise shares many architectural similarities.

=== Dimensions ===
Its dimensions are 9.6 in (24 cm) x 10.4 in (26 cm) x 4.6 in (12 cm) (W x D x H). The weight is 12 lb (5.4 kg).

== NVRAM ==
The SPARCstation IPX uses an M48T02 battery-backed RTC with RAM chip which handles the real time clock and boot parameter storage. The only problem with this chip is that the battery is internal, which means the entire chip must be replaced when its battery runs out. As all sun4c machines are now older than the battery life of this chip, a substantial number of these systems now refuse to boot. Additionally, the sun4c design used the reserved bits in the M48T02's NVRAM in a non-standard way; since later revisions of the M48T02 chip exert stricter control over these bits, a current M48T02 will store the NVRAM data, but the RTC will not function correctly and the system may fail to auto-boot.

Due to incompatibilities with modern M48T02s, it is common to modify failed NVRAMs by cutting into the encapsulation and patching in a new battery. It is also possible to replace the entire encapsulation, which also contains a 32.768 kHz clock crystal.

== Operating systems ==
The following operating systems will run on a SPARCstation IPX:

- SunOS 4.1.1 onwards
- Solaris 2.0 to Solaris 7 (sun4c dropped in Solaris 8)
- Linux - Some, but not all, distributions still support this sparc32 sub-architecture
- NetBSD/sparc32 since 1.0
- OpenBSD/sparc32 - All versions up to 5.9 (OpenBSD 5.9 was the last release to support SPARC32)

== Related computers ==
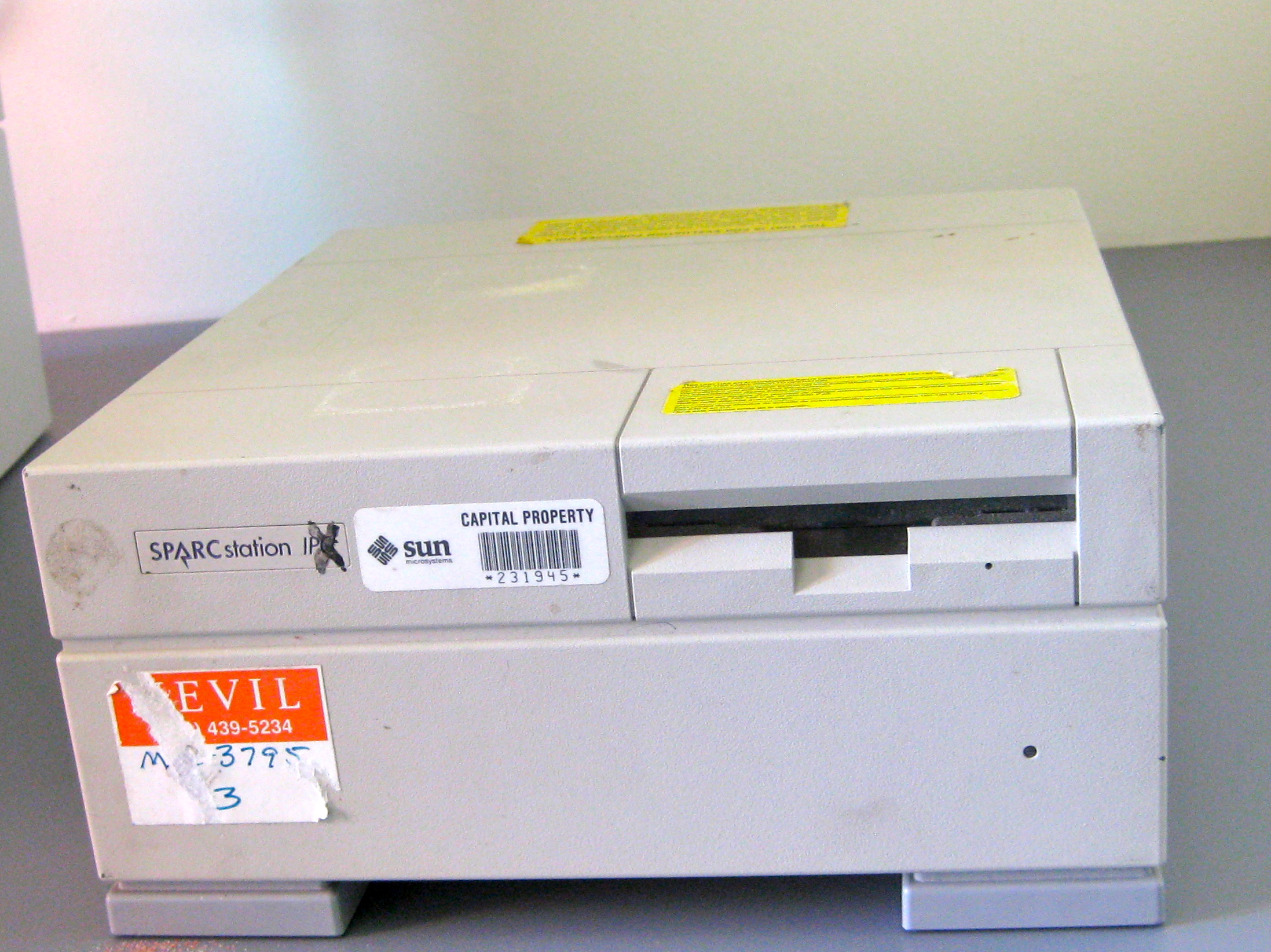
SPARCstation IPX prototype computer, reusing SPARCstation IPC casing.

The SPARCstation IPC (Sun 4/40) is an earlier lunchbox form factor system.

The SPARCstation 2 (Sun 4/75) is architecturally very similar and can use the same CPU and SBus RAM upgrades.

== See also ==
- SPARCstation LX
- SPARCclassic
