= SPARCstation 2 =

Computer sold by Sun Microsystems

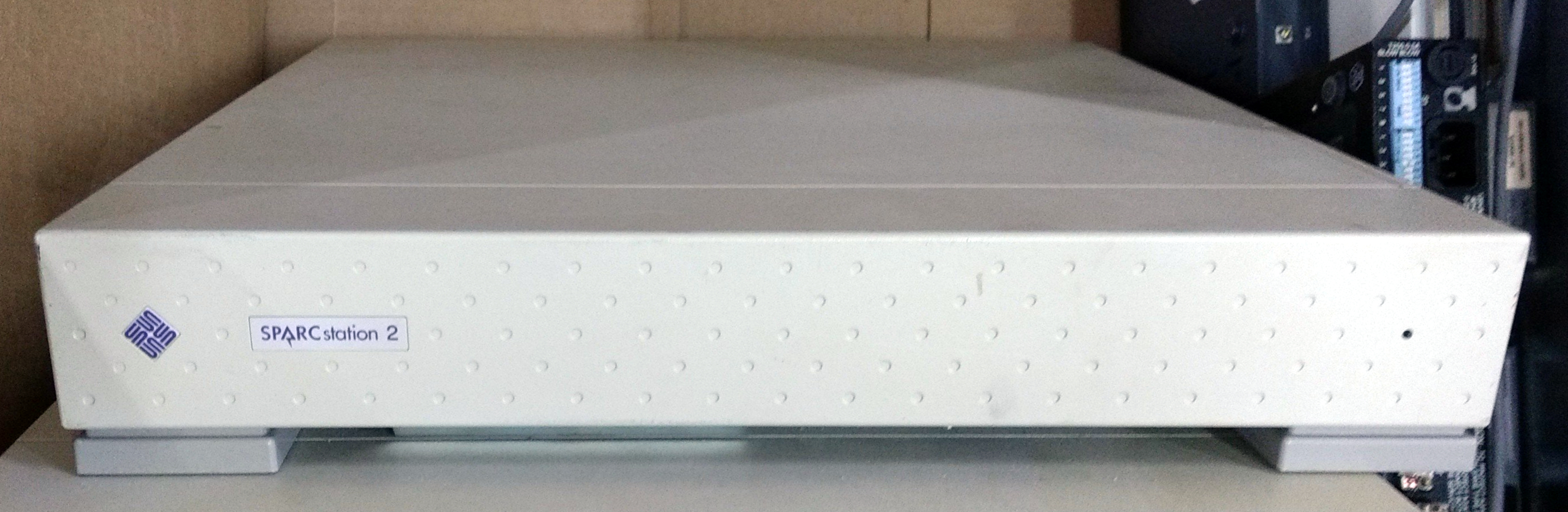
- Codename: Calvin
- Also known as: 4/75
- Developer: Sun Microsystems
- Manufacturer: Sun Microsystems
- Product family: SPARCstation
- Type: Workstation
- Released: November 5, 1990
- Availability: November 5, 1990
- Introductory price: US$14,995–49,995
- Units sold: Over 540,000
- Operating system: SunOS; Solaris
- CPU: Cypress CY7C601 (SPARC) at 40 MHz
- Memory: 1–64 MB
- Predecessor: SPARCstation 1+
- Successor: SPARCstation 10
- Related: SPARCstation IPX

The SPARCstation 2 (Sun 4/75, code-named Calvin) is a SPARC-based workstation computer sold by Sun Microsystems as part of their SPARCstation family. Sun introduced it on November 5, 1990, for between US$14,995 at the low end to US$49,995 at the high end (equivalent to $36,953–123,205 in 2025). Based on the sun4c architecture, the SPARCstation 2 features a 40-MHz SPARC processor. Like its predecessor the SPARCstation 1+, it is housed in a pizza-box case. The SPARCstation 2 was a smash success, Sun selling over 540,000 units by mid-1992.

== Sales ==
Sun released the SPARCstation 2 on November 5, 1990, to very high demand, and by the end of January 1991, the company had sold 9,000 units. It was the best-selling workstation of 1991, a year which saw the total amount of workstation shipments backslide somewhat compared to 1990. By June 1992, by which point Sun had introduced its successor the SPARCstation 10, Sun had sold at least 540,000 units of the SPARCstation 2. The SPARCstation 2 accounted for 40 percent of Sun's total revenue in the first quarter of 1992, and an industry analyst dubbed it "the heart of [Sun's] product line".

== Specifications ==
=== CPU ===
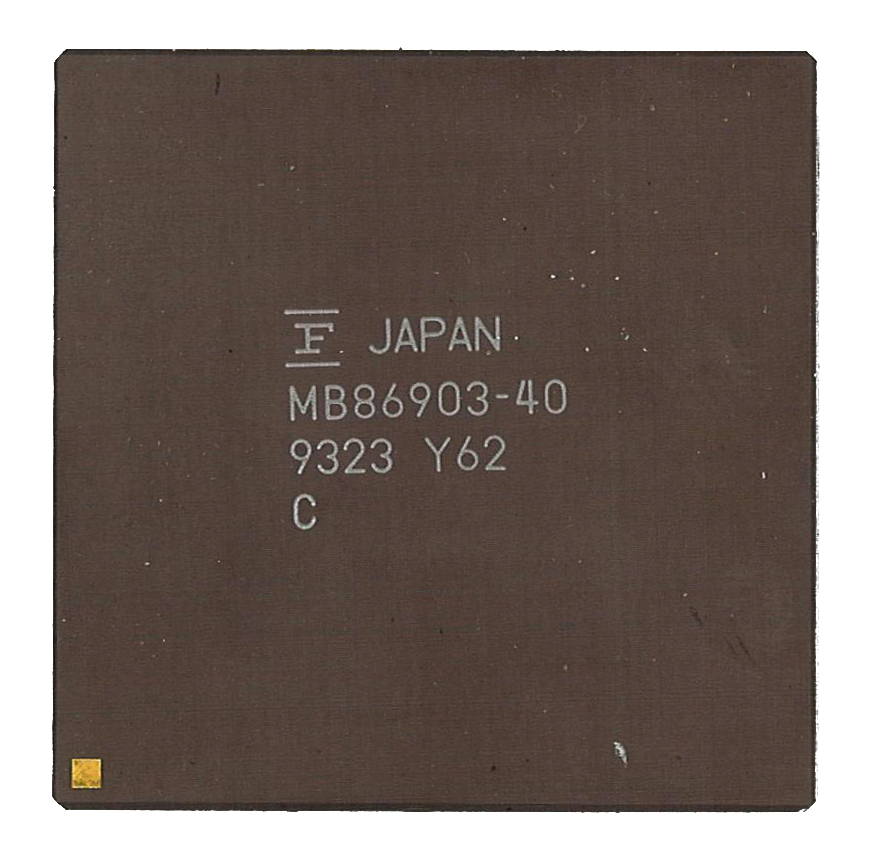
Fujitsu MB86903-40

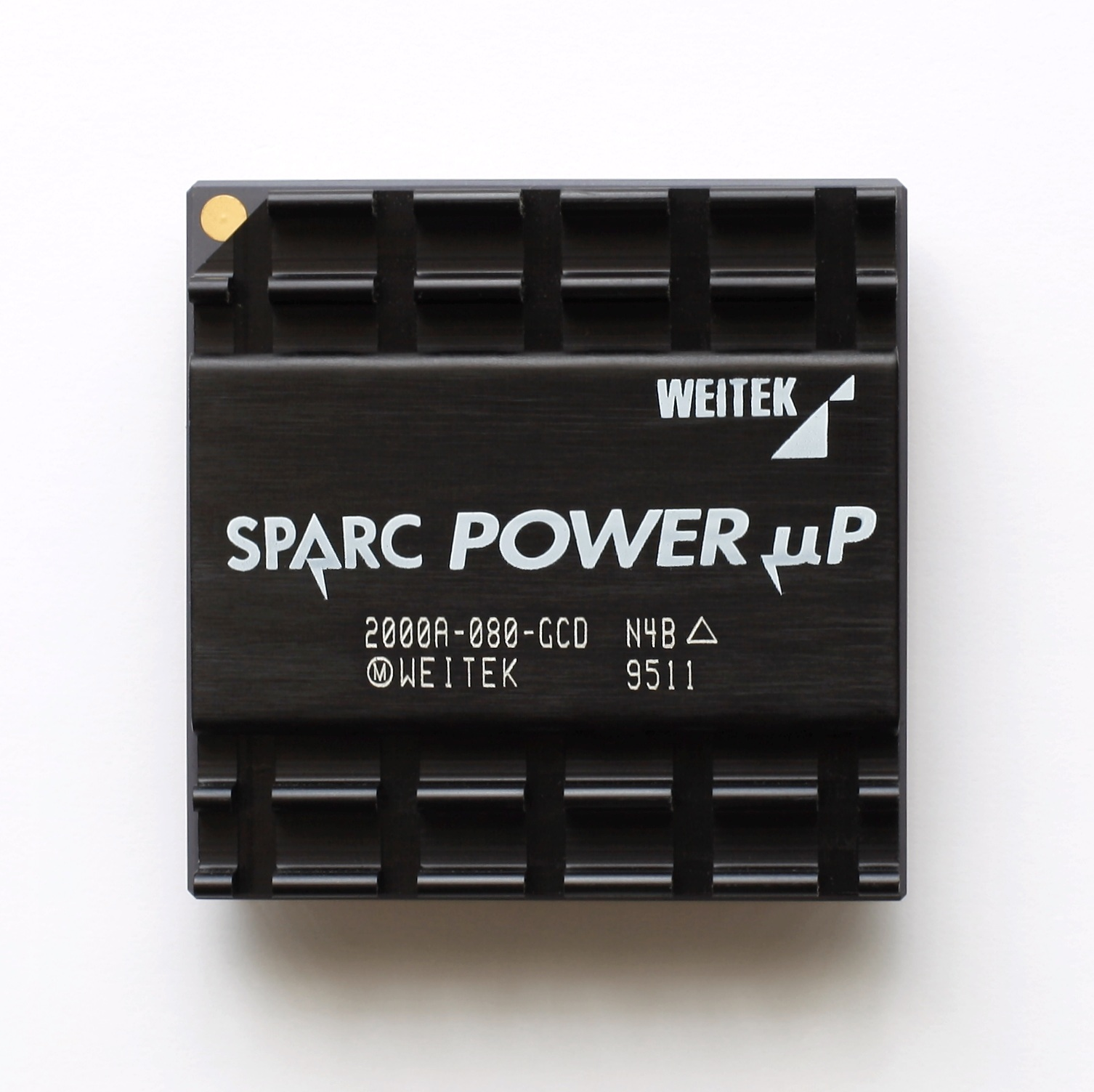
Weitek SPARC Power μP

The SPARCstation 2 features a 40 MHz Cypress CY7C601 CPU (28.5 MIPS), TI TMS390C601A FPU (4.2 MFLOPS). The only CPU upgrade option was the Weitek 80 MHz SPARC POWER μP (pronounced "power up").

=== Memory ===
The SPARCstation 2 can be configured with up to 128 MB of memory in total: 64 MB on the motherboard, and an additional 64 MB using a special 32 MB SBus memory card with another 32 MB piggy-backed daughterboard.

The 16 RAM slots on the motherboard can be populated with either 1 MB SIMMs for a total of 16 MB, or with 4 MB SIMMs for a total of 64 MB. Standard 30-pin SIMMs can be used as long as they use parity error detection and are rated 80 ns or faster.

=== Dimensions ===
Its dimensions are 16 in (41 cm) x 16 in (41 cm) x 2.8 in (7.1 cm) (W x D x H). The weight is 25 lb (11 kg).

=== Disk drives ===
The SPARCstation 2 uses a standard 50-pin SCSI interface and can house two 3 1/2" full-height disk drives. The SS2 also comes with a special auto-ejecting 1.44 MB floppy disk drive.

Modern 80-pin Single Connector Attachment (SCA) SCSI drives can be used internally with an adapter, but the plastic drive sled used with 50-pin drives must be cut to allow clearance for the adapter board. SCA drives may run hotter than original SCSI drives and cause heating issues, especially if two drives are installed.

=== Network ===
There is an Ethernet AUI port on board, which can be supplemented by add-on SBus cards. Onboard Ethernet is provided by an AMD Lance Am7990 Ethernet controller. External AUI transceivers are required for connection to 10BASE5, 10BASE2, 10BASE-T, or other Ethernet physical layer media. The OpenBoot ROM is able to boot from network, using RARP and TFTP.

== NVRAM ==
The SPARCstation 2 uses an M48T02 battery-backed RTC with RAM chip which handles the real time clock and boot parameter storage. The only problem with this chip is that the battery is internal, which means the entire chip must be replaced when its battery runs out. As all sun4c machines are now older than the battery life of this chip, a substantial number of these systems now refuse to boot. Additionally, the sun4c design used the reserved bits in the M48T02's NVRAM in a non-standard way; since later revisions of the M48T02 chip exert stricter control over these bits, a current M48T02 will store the NVRAM data, but the RTC will not function correctly and the system may fail to auto-boot.

Due to incompatibilities with modern M48T02s, it is common to modify failed NVRAMs by cutting into the encapsulation and patching in a new battery. It is also possible to replace the entire encapsulation, which also contains a 32.768 kHz clock crystal.

== Operating systems ==
The following operating systems will run on a SPARCstation 2:

- SunOS 4.1.1 onwards
- Solaris 2.0 to Solaris 7 (sun4c dropped in Solaris 8)
- Linux - Some, but not all, distributions supported this sparc32 sub-architecture; it had support in Debian from Debian 2.1 (March 1999) through Debian 4.0 (etch), last updated in May 2010.
- NetBSD/sparc32 since 1.0
- OpenBSD/sparc32 - All versions up to 5.9 (OpenBSD 5.9 was the last release to support SPARC32)

== See also ==
- SPARCstation IPX, an architecturally similar machine in a lunchbox form factor
