= SPARCstation 1 =

Early 1990s computer workstation

SPARCstation 1; SPARCstation 1+
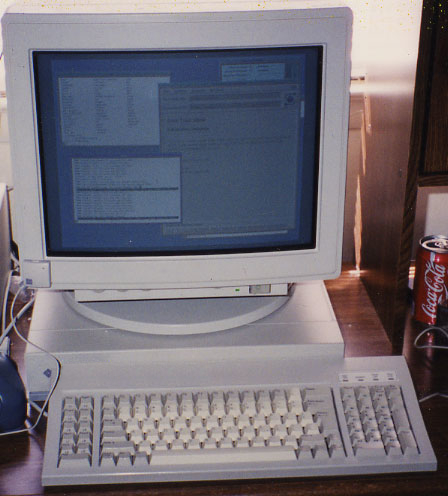
- SPARCstation 1+
- Codename: Campus
- Also known as: 4/60
- Developer: Sun Microsystems
- Manufacturer: Sun Microsystems
- Product family: SPARCstation
- Type: Workstation
- Released: April 12, 1989
- Availability: July 1989
- Introductory price: US$8,995–15,400
- Units sold: Over 120,000
- Operating system: SunOS; Solaris
- CPU: LSI Logic SPARC at 20 MHz (1) or 25 MHz (1+)
- Memory: 1–64 MB
- Predecessor: Sun-4
- Successor: SPARCstation 2
- Related: SPARCstation IPC

The SPARCstation 1 (Sun 4/60, code-named Campus) is the first of the SPARCstation series of SPARC-based workstations sold by Sun Microsystems. The design originated in 1987 by a Sun spin-off company, UniSun, which was soon re-acquired. The SPARCstation 1 has a distinctive slim enclosure (a square 3-inch-high "pizza box") and was first announced in April 1989; the first units shipped in July that year.

Based on an LSI Logic RISC CPU running at 20 MHz, with a Weitek 3170 (or 3172) FPU coprocessor, it was the fourth Sun computer (after the 4/260, 4/110 and 4/280) to use the SPARC architecture and the first of the sun4c architecture. The motherboard has three SBus slots, built-in AUI Ethernet, 8 kHz audio, and a 5 MB/s SCSI-1 bus. The basic display runs at 1152 × 900 in 256 colours, and monitors shipped with the computer were 16 to 19 inch greyscale or colour. Sun released the SPARCstation 1+, an upgrade to the SPARCstation 1 which increased the clock speed of the CPU to 25 MHz among other hardware improvements, in 1990.

Designed for ease of production to compete with high-end PCs or Macs, its principal competitors were the IBM PS/2 Model 80, the NeXT Computer, and Sun's own 3/80. It sold for between about US$8,995, with no hard disks, to US$15,400 with a hard disk (equivalent to $23,363–39,999 in 2025). Within the first 18 months of its introduction, over 120,000 units were sold. Sun ended support for the SPARCstation 1 and 1+ in 1995.

== Design ==
The SPARCstation 1 features several distinctive design and packaging elements driven internally by system designer Andy Bechtolsheim and externally by design house frog design. Bechtolsheim specified that the motherboard would be the size of a sheet of paper and the SBus expansion cards would be the size of index cards, resulting in an extremely compact footprint. The external design motif includes dot-patterned cooling vents on the side which are echoed by a "dimple" pattern on the front face, and "Sun purple" feet.

== Memory ==
The SPARCstation 1 takes 30-pin SIMMs in groups of four. It can take either 1 MB or 4 MB SIMMs as long as the size is consistent within a bank. There are a total of four memory banks, which can give a total of 64 MB of memory. Memory bank 0 (composed of U0311, U0322, U0309, and U0307) should be filled first. If not, the OpenBoot firmware will hang while memory checking.

== Disk drives ==
The SPARCstation 1 has space for up to two hard drives and one floppy drive internally. The machine will take any 50-pin SCSI-2 hard drive, but the OpenBoot firmware will not boot from any partition which starts or ends after 1024 MB. The floppy drive, like the Macintosh's, is unusual in that it has an electromechanical eject mechanism rather than the conventional eject button, and therefore must be ejected by the operating system or OpenBoot. The machine can connect to any SCSI CD drive, via either the SCSI connector on the back or by connecting it to any spare internal SCSI connector via a 50-pin cable.

== Network support ==
The SPARCstation 1 comes with an on-board AMD Lance Ethernet chipset and a 15-pin AUI connector, which can connect to 10BASE2, 10BASE5 or 10BASE-T via an appropriate transceiver. The OpenBoot ROM is able to boot from network, using RARP and TFTP. Like all other SPARCstation systems, the SPARCstation 1 holds system information such as MAC address and host id (serial number) in NVRAM. If the battery on this chip dies, then the system will not be able to boot.

== NVRAM ==
The SPARCstation 1 uses an M48T02 battery-backed RTC with RAM chip which handles the real time clock and boot parameter storage. A problem with this chip is that the battery is internal, which means the entire chip must be replaced when its battery runs out. As all SPARCstation 1s made are now older than the battery life of this chip, a substantial number of these systems now refuse to boot. Additionally, the SPARCstation 1 design used the reserved bits in the M48T02's NVRAM in a non-standard way; since later revisions of the M48T02 chip exert stricter control over these bits, a current M48T02 will store the NVRAM data, but the RTC will not function correctly and the system may fail to auto-boot.

Due to incompatibilities with modern M48T02s, it is common to modify failed NVRAMs by cutting into the encapsulation and patching in a new battery. It is also possible to replace the entire encapsulation, which also contains a 32.768 kHz clock crystal.

== Operating systems ==
The SPARCstation 1, 1+, IPC and SLC can run the following operating systems:

- SunOS 4.0.3c through 5.7 (Solaris 7)
- Linux (modern versions may have trouble with the limited amount of memory in these machines)
- NetBSD 1.0 onwards
- OpenBSD (all versions up to 5.9 – OpenBSD 5.9 was the last release to support SPARC32)

== Notable uses ==
- Four or five SPARCstation 1 units were used by Game Freak to develop Pokémon Red and Green.

== Related computers ==
The SPARCstation 1+ (Sun 4/65) pushed the CPU to a 25 MHz LSI L64801, upgraded the coprocessor to a Weitek 3172 and installed a new SCSI controller, announced in April 1990.

The SPARCstation IPC (Sun 4/40) is a version of the SPARCstation 1+ in a lunchbox style case and onboard video.

The SPARCstation SLC (Sun 4/20) is a version of the SPARCstation 1+ built into a monitor cabinet, announced in May 1990.

The SPARCstation 2 (Sun 4/75) is the machine's successor and was released in November 1990.
