= Sun4d =

1992 computer architecture

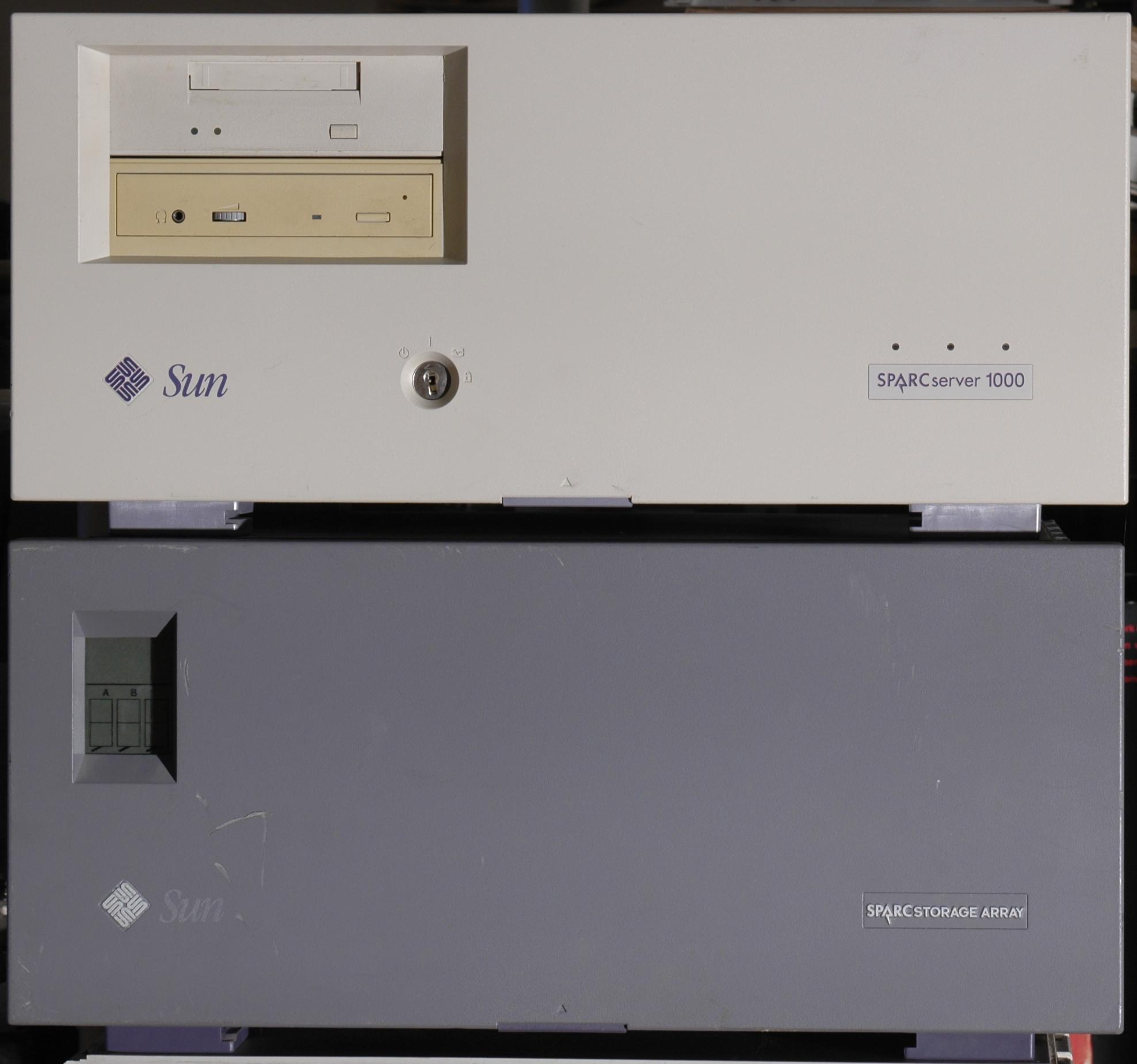
SPARCserver 1000 and SPARCstorage Array

Sun4d is a computer architecture introduced by Sun Microsystems in 1992. It is a development of the earlier Sun-4 architecture, using the XDBus system bus, SuperSPARC processors, and SBus I/O cards. The XDBus was the result of a collaboration between Sun and Xerox; its name comes from an earlier Xerox project, the Xerox Dragon. These were Sun's largest machines to date, and their first attempt at making a mainframe-class server.

== Architecture ==
Sun4d computers are true SMP systems; although memory and CPUs are installed per system board, the memory on a given board is not in any way "closer" to the CPUs on that same board. All memory and I/O devices are equally connected to all CPUs.

All of these computers use a passive backplane into which system boards are plugged. Each system board provides CPUs, memory, and an I/O bus. As system boards are added, these components are added to the whole in a completely seamless fashion. It is not a cluster, but works as a single large machine.

== Machines ==
Sun4d computers include the SPARCcenter 2000 (1992) and SPARCserver 1000 (1993) from Sun Microsystems, and the Cray CS6400 (1993) from Cray Research. The system boards in these three machines are all slightly different, physically and electronically, and are not interchangeable.

All Sun4d machines provide JTAG ports, although unlike later systems the SPARCcenter and SPARCserver only use it for maintenance purposes.

=== SPARCserver 1000 ===
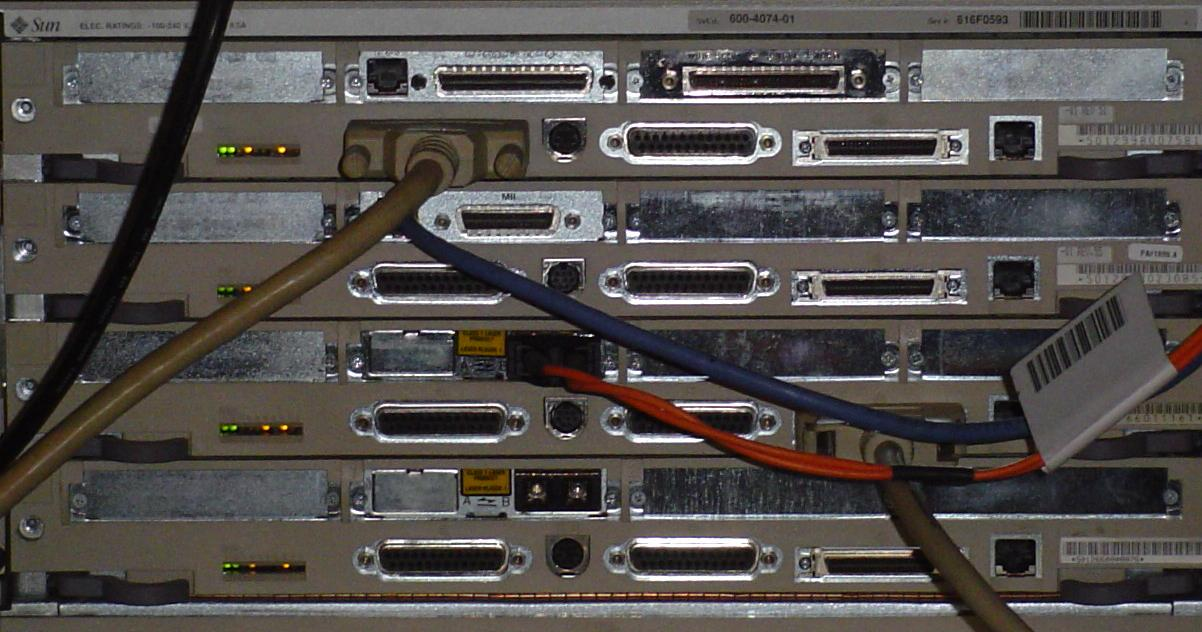
SS1000E

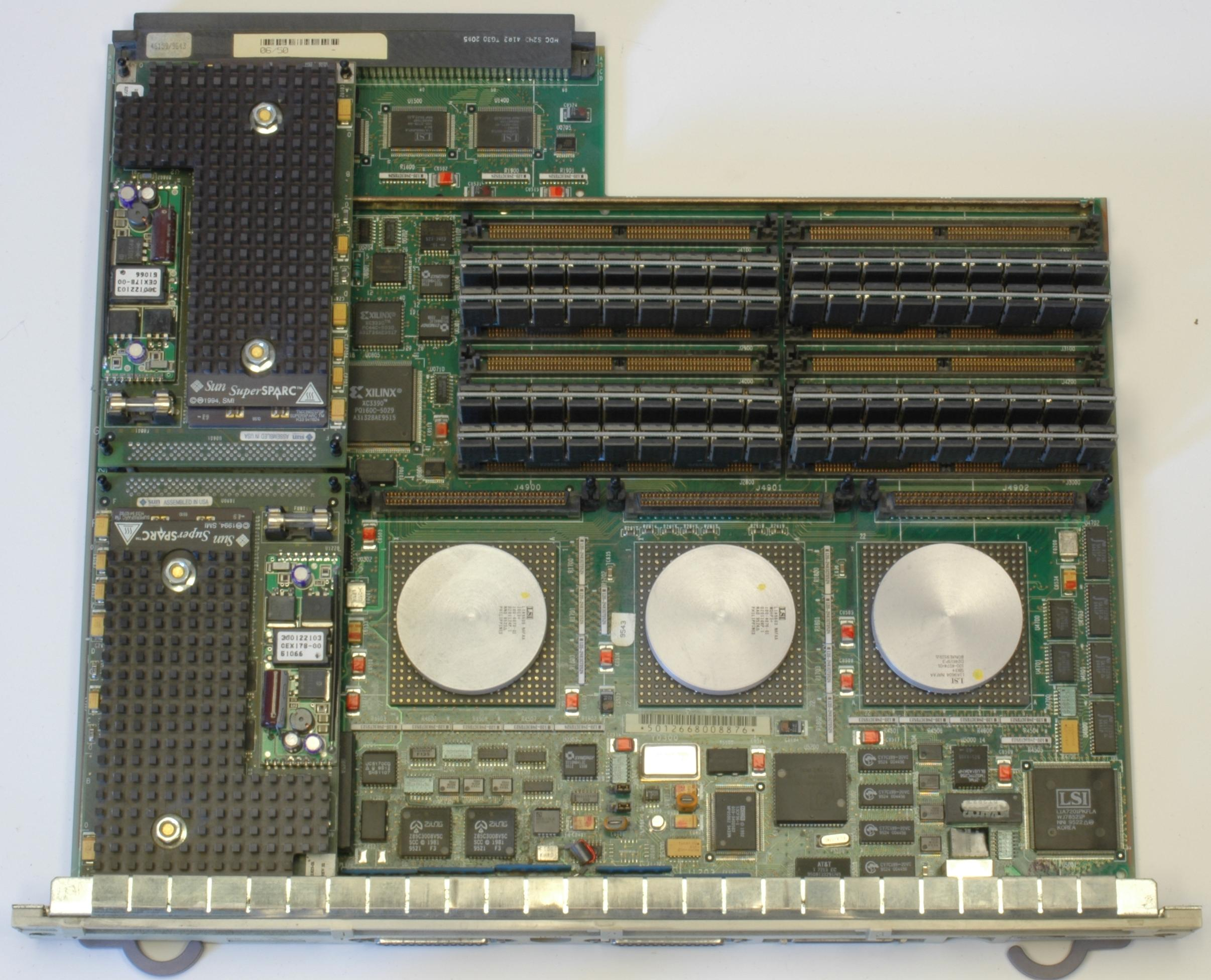
SS1000E System Board

The SPARCserver 1000 is a 5U rackmountable chassis with four 40 MHz XDBus slots, and space for four half-height 3.5" SCSI drives plus two half-height front-accessible 5.25" SCSI drives (typically used for CD-ROM and DAT). Each system board connects to one XDBus and provides two MBus slots for CPUs, three SBus slots for I/O boards, four banks of memory (four SIMMs apiece), and builtin SCSI-2, 10baseT Ethernet, and two serial ports.

Maximum configuration: eight CPUs and 2 GB RAM.

The SPARCserver 1000E has a slightly faster XDBus (50 MHz). The system boards are not backwards compatible.

The SPARCserver 1000, like earlier Sun-4/xxx servers, has a set of LEDs on each system board that display diagnostics on POST, and CPU load while running. These allow the user to see at a glance how busy each processor on the system is. They are informally referred to as "Cylon" displays, because of the way each displays a single light bouncing back and forth resembles the scanner of the robots in the original Battlestar Galactica television series.

The SPARCserver 1000 will run a slightly-patched Linux 2.4 kernel in SMP mode.

A single octo-processor SPARCserver 1000 helped 117 SPARCstation 20 Model HS11 units, 87 with two 100 MHz hyperSPARC processors and 30 with four 100 MHz hyperSPARC processors, to render Toy Story.

=== SPARCcenter 2000 ===
The SPARCcenter 2000 is a full rack system that includes a main chassis with ten 40MHz dual-XDBus slots and several disk arrays. The system boards connect to two XDBuses for extra bandwidth, and provide two MBus slots, four SBus slots, four banks of memory (four SIMMs apiece), and two serial ports apiece. Unlike the SPARCserver 1000 boards, they do not have a builtin SCSI and Ethernet port per system board.

Maximum configuration: twenty CPUs and 5 GB RAM.

The SPARCcenter 2000E has a slightly faster XDBus (50 MHz). The system boards are not backwards compatible.

=== Cray Superserver 6400 ===
The Cray CS6400 is a 16-slot, 55 MHz quad-XDBus system. Each system board provides four MBus slots, four SBus slots, four banks of memory, and no builtin I/O ports.

Maximum configuration: sixty-four CPUs and 16 GB RAM.

When SGI purchased Cray Research in 1996, they sold the division responsible for the CS6400 to Sun, where it was developed into the extremely successful Sun Enterprise 10000.

== Performance ==
Relative performance of Sun-4d machines, based on SPEC CINT92 Rate benchmarks:

System	Processors	geometric mean rate_int92	008 espresso SPEC rate	022 li SPEC rate	023 eqntott SPEC rate	026 compress SPEC rate	072 sc SPEC rate	085 gcc SPEC rate
CS6400	64	101969	98449	147287	139144	32849	214882	78932
SC2000E	20	53714	46817	54551	74541	28564	107441	41111
SS1000E	8	21758	19578	26184	26089	11680	45238	15014

== See also ==
- Sun-4
- SPARCstation
