= MB86900 =

General information
- Launched: 1986
- Designed by: Fujitsu

Performance
- Max. CPU clock rate: 16.67 MHz

Architecture and classification
- Instruction set: SPARC V7

Physical specifications
- Cores: 1

The MB86900 is a microprocessor produced by Fujitsu, which implements the SPARC V7 instruction set architecture developed by Sun Microsystems. It was the first implementation of SPARC, introduced in 1986, and was used in the first SPARC-based workstation, the Sun Microsystems Sun-4, from 1987. Its chipset operated at 16.67 MHz. The chipset consisted of two chips, the MB86900 microprocessor and the MB86910 floating-point controller. The chip set was implemented with two 20,000-gate, 1.2 μm complementary metal–oxide–semiconductor (CMOS) gate-arrays fabricated by Fujitsu Limited. The MB86910 floating-point controller was designed to work together with two Weitek chips – the WTL1164 multiplier and WTL1165 arithmetic logic unit – to comprise a floating-point unit.

== Bibliography ==
- Namjoo, M. (1989). "SPARC implementations: ASIC vs. custom design". Proceedings of the Twenty-Second Annual Hawaii International Conference on System Sciences.
