= Address translation =

Address translation or address resolution may refer to:

- Network address translation
- Address Resolution Protocol or ARP, a computer networking protocol used to find out the hardware address of a host (usually a MAC address), when only the network layer address is known
- Reverse Address Resolution Protocol or RARP, a protocol used to find the network layer address of a host, based only on the hardware address. This protocol has been rendered obsolete by both BOOTP and DHCP
- Domain Name System (DNS), which is used to translate human-recognizable domain names to network addresses and vice versa and to store and retrieve other data
- Virtual-to-physical address translation
