= Sun-3 =

Series of computer workstations and servers

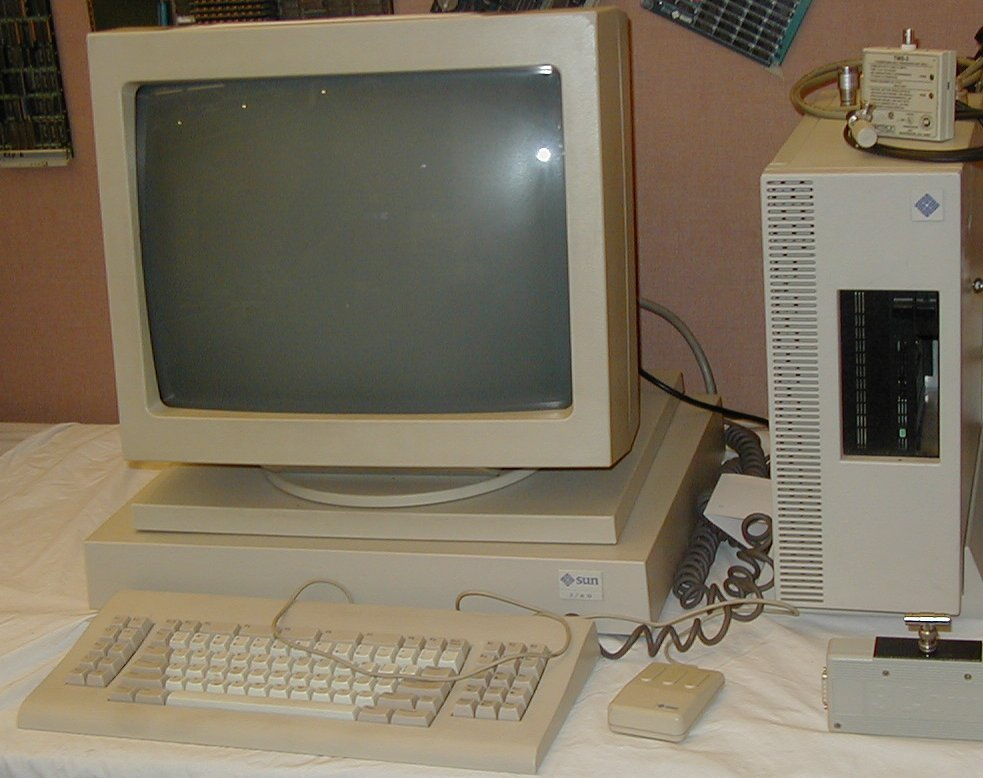
A Sun 3/60 workstation with disk and tape

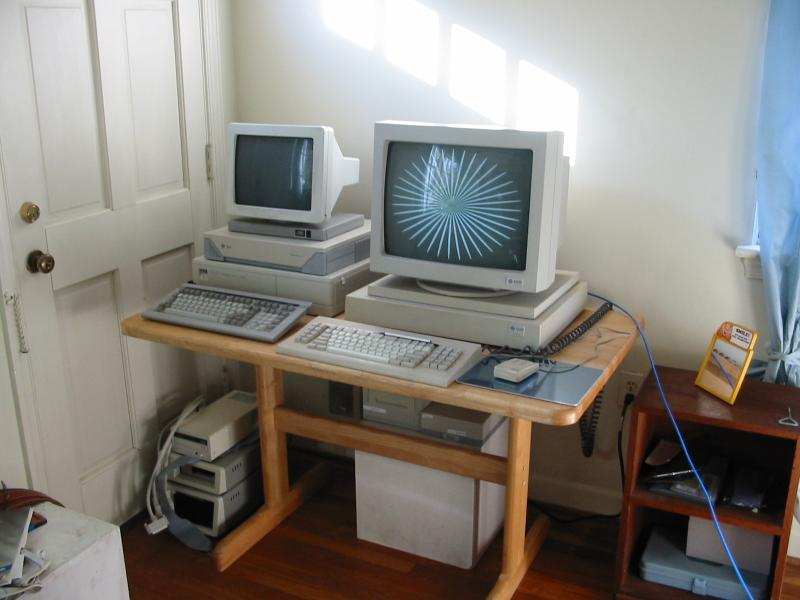
Computer worktable with three UNIX workstations, the one on the right is a Sun 3/60

Sun-3 is a series of UNIX computer workstations and servers produced by Sun Microsystems, launched on September 9, 1985. The Sun-3 series are VMEbus-based systems similar to some of the earlier Sun-2 series, but using the Motorola 68020 microprocessor, in combination with the Motorola 68881 floating-point co-processor (optional on the Sun 3/50) and a proprietary Sun MMU. Sun-3 systems were supported in SunOS versions 3.0 to 4.1.1_U1 and also have current support in NetBSD and Linux. It used to be supported by OpenBSD, but the port was discontinued after the 2.9 release.

== Sun-3 models ==
Models are listed in approximately chronological order.

Model	Codename	CPU board	CPU MHz	Max. RAM	Chassis
3/75	Carrera	Sun 3004	16.67 MHz	8 MB	2-slot VME (desktop)
3/140	Carrera	Sun 3004	16.67 MHz	16 MB	3-slot VME (desktop/side)
3/160	Carrera	Sun 3004	16.67 MHz	16 MB	12-slot VME (deskside)
3/180	Carrera	Sun 3004	16.67 MHz	16 MB	12-slot VME (rackmount)
3/150	Carrera	Sun 3004	16.67 MHz	16 MB	6-slot VME (deskside)
3/50	Model 25	—	15.7 MHz	4 MB	"wide Pizza-box" desktop
3/110	Prism	—	16.67 MHz	12 MB	3-slot VME (desktop/side)
3/260	Sirius	Sun 3200	25 MHz (CPU), 20 MHz (FPU)	32 MB	12-slot VME (deskside)
3/280	Sirius	Sun 3200	25 MHz (CPU), 20 MHz (FPU)	32 MB	12-slot VME (rackmount)
3/60	Ferrari	—	20 MHz	24 MB	"wide Pizza-box" desktop
3/E	Polaris	Sun 3/E	20 MHz	16 MB	none (6U VME board)

(Max. RAM sizes may be greater when third-party memory boards are used.)

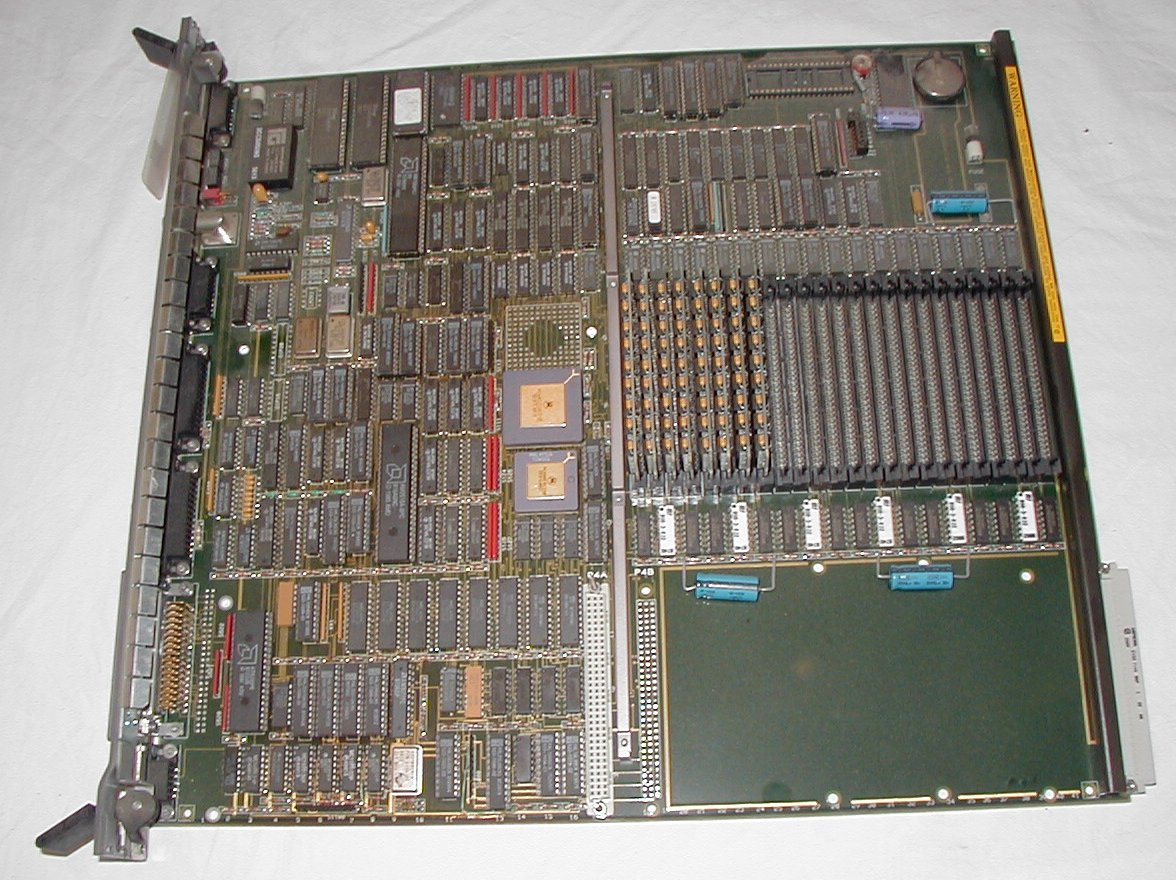
Original Sun-3 CPU board

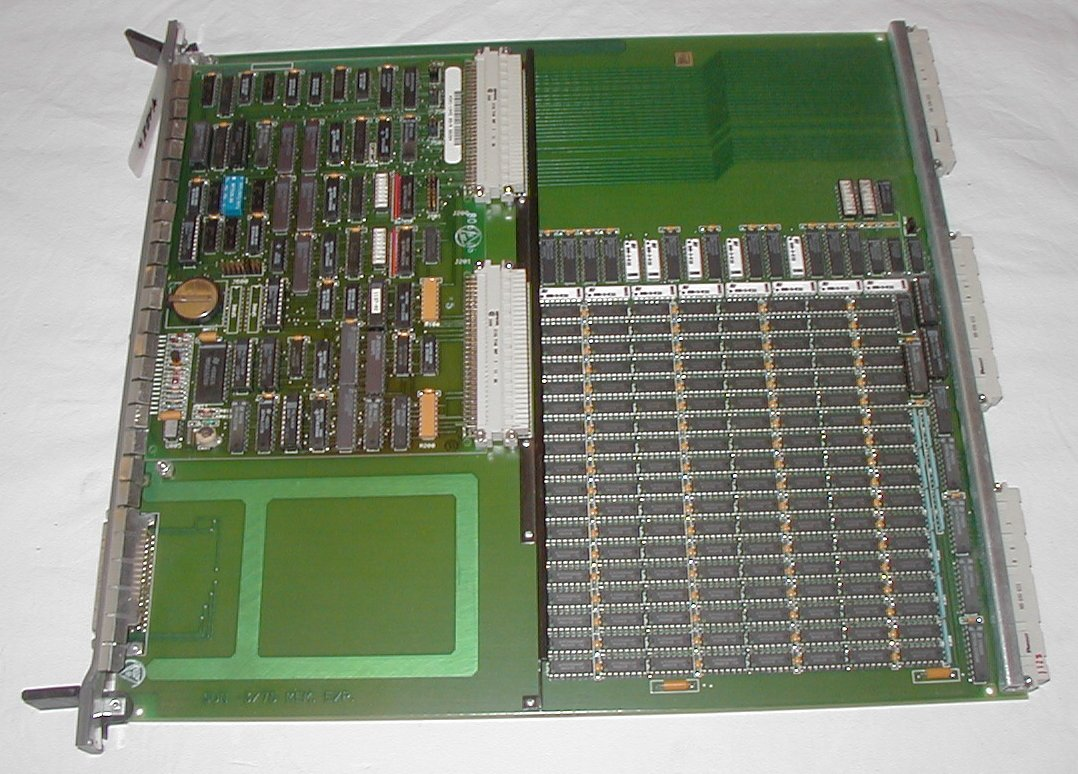
Original Sun-3 4 MB memory board with Sun-3 SCSI daughter board

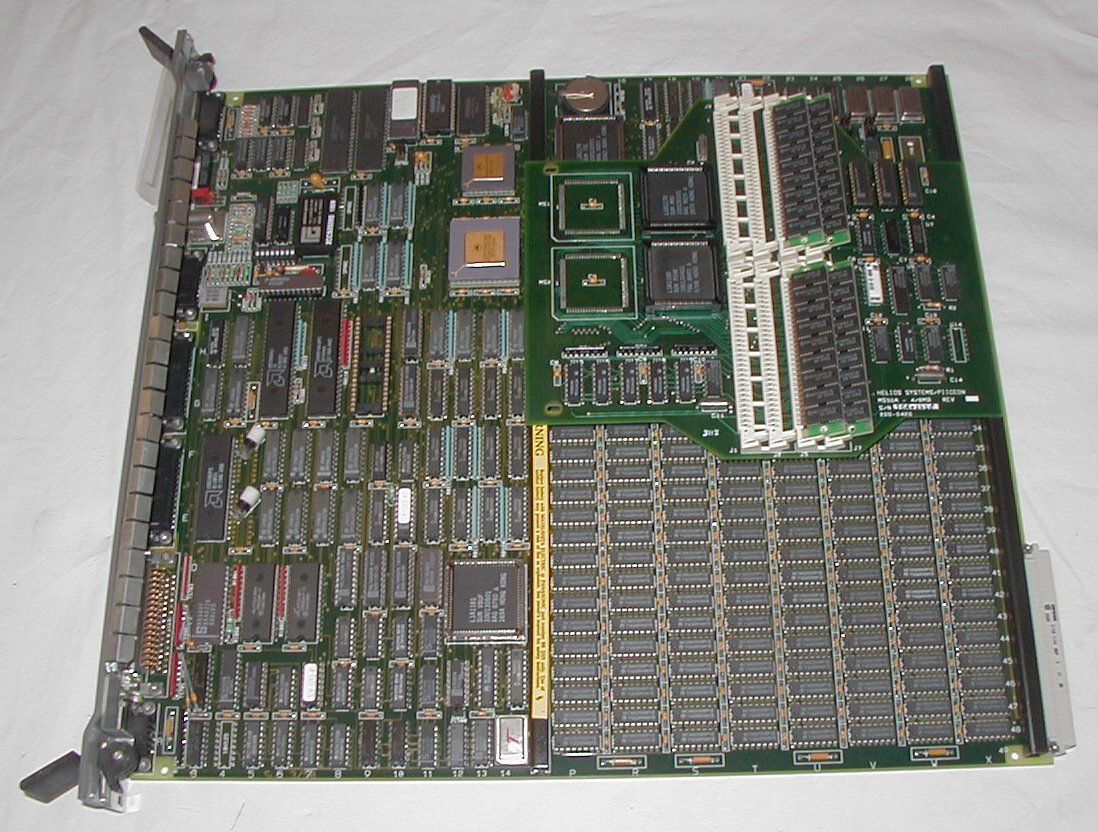
Sun 3/50 CPU board with Helios 4 MB memory expansion

=== Keyboard ===
The Sun Type 3 keyboard is split into three blocks:

- special keys
- main block
- numeric pad

It shipped with Sun-3 systems.

== Sun-3x ==
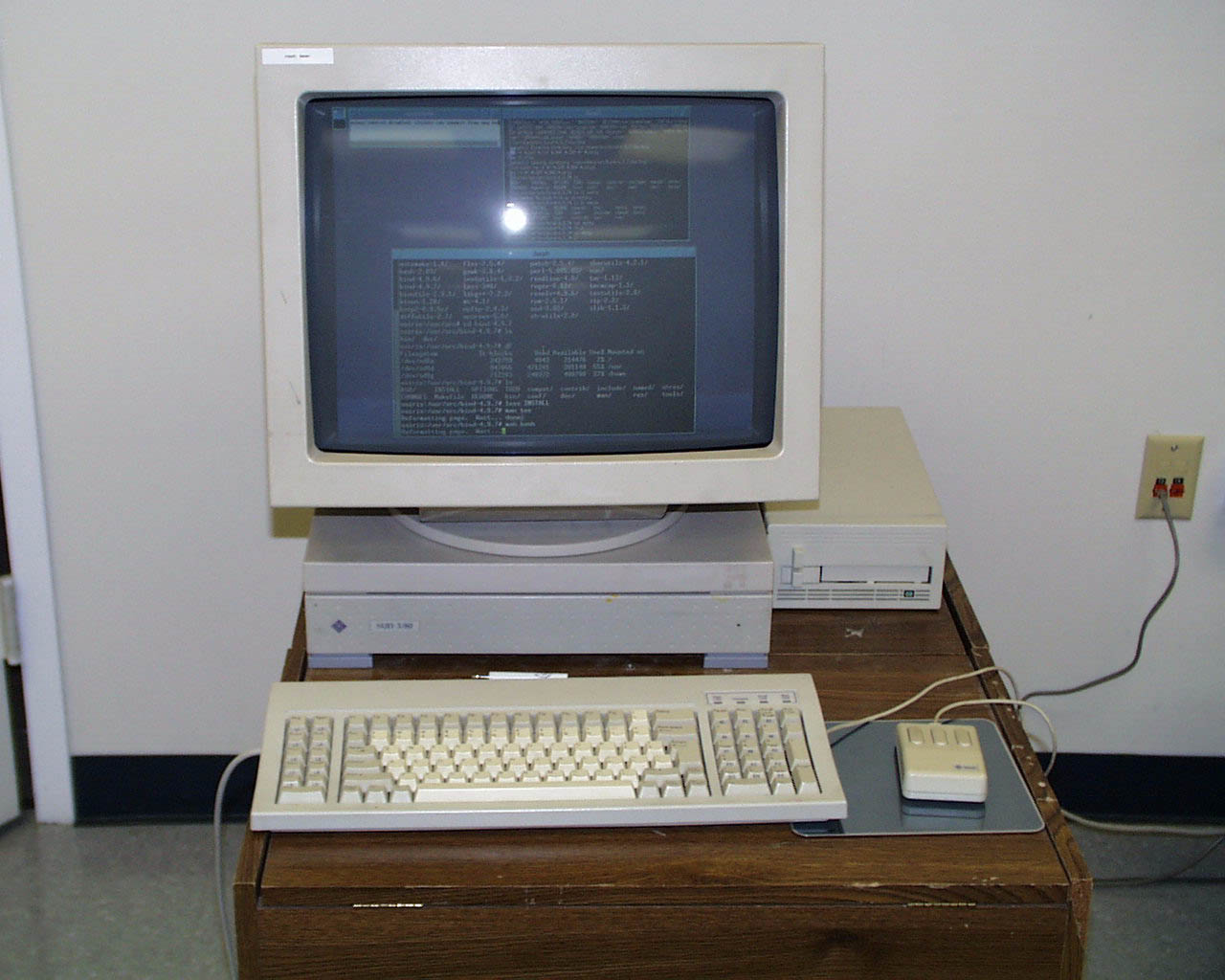
A Sun 3/80 workstation

In 1989, coincident with the launch of the SPARCstation 1, Sun launched three new Sun-3 models, the 3/80, 3/470 and 3/480. Unlike previous Sun-3s, these use a Motorola 68030 processor, 68882 floating-point unit, and the 68030's integral MMU. This 68030-based architecture is called Sun-3x.

Model	Codename	CPU board	CPU MHz	Max. RAM	Chassis
3/80	Hydra	-	20 MHz	16, 40 or 64 MB	"Pizza-box" desktop
3/460	Pegasus	Sun 3400	33 MHz	128 MB	12-slot VME (deskside, older design)
3/470	Pegasus	Sun 3400	33 MHz	128 MB	12-slot VME (deskside, newer design )
3/480	Pegasus	Sun 3400	33 MHz	128 MB	12-slot VME (rackmount)

Sun 3/260s upgraded with Sun 3400 CPU boards are known as Sun 3/460s.

== See also ==
- Sun 3 Motorola-based systems
- Sun-1
- Sun-2
- Sun386i
- Sun-4
- SPARCstation
