= Maintenance Operations Protocol =

Method of downlading data to certain computers

The Maintenance Operation Protocol (MOP) is used for utility services such as uploading and downloading system software, remote testing and problem diagnosis. It was a proprietary protocol of Digital Equipment Corporation. MOP frames can be one of the following commands:

Command	Description
[memory load data]	Contains memory load data.
[mem load request]	Request for memory load segment.
[mem load w/addr]	Memory load with transfer address.
[par load w/addr]	Parameter load with transfer address.
[dump service req]	Request for assistance with dump operation.
[mem dump request]	Request for next memory dump segment.
[memory dump data]	Contains memory dump data.
[dump completed]	Acknowledgment of dump completion.
[volunteer assist]	Offer of dump/load/loop assistance.
[request program]	Request for system or loader program.
[rem boot request]	Request for boot program.
[remote ID reqst]	Request for remote console identification.
[remote system ID]	Remote console identification information.
[counters request]	Request for communication information counters.
[counters reply]	Communication information counters.
[reserve console]	Remote console in reserved state.
[release console]	Release of remote console from reserved state.
[rem console poll]	Poll of remote console for status.
[rem console rply]	Response to remote console poll.
[loopback request]	Request to loopback enclosed data.
[loopback reply]	Response to loopback request with data.

== See also ==
- Reverse Address Resolution Protocol (RARP)
