= SPARCstation =

Sun Microsystems computer family

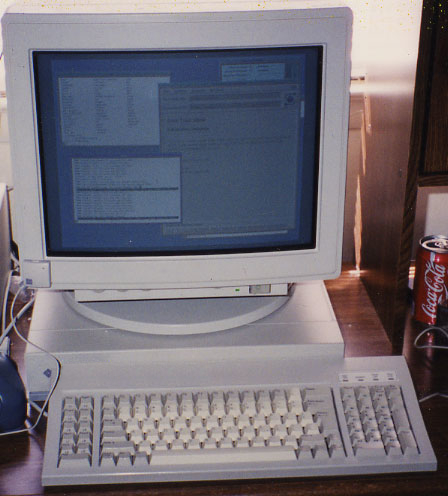
Sun SPARCstation 1+ "pizzabox", 25 MHz SPARC processor, early 1990s

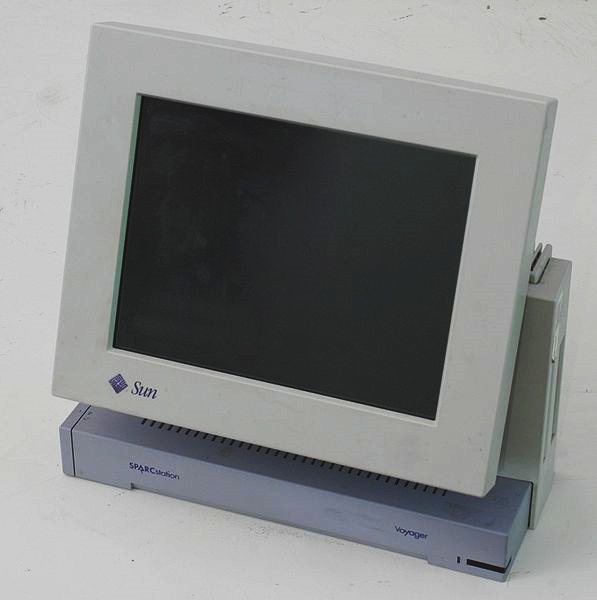
SPARCstation Voyager

The SPARCstation, SPARCserver and SPARCcenter product lines are a series of SPARC-based computer workstations and servers in desktop, desk side (pedestal) and rack-based form factor configurations, that were developed and sold by Sun Microsystems.

The first SPARCstation was the SPARCstation 1 (also known as the Sun 4/60), introduced in 1989. The series was very popular and introduced the Sun-4c architecture, a variant of the Sun-4 architecture previously introduced in the Sun 4/260. Thanks in part to the delay in the development of more modern processors from Motorola, the SPARCstation series was very successful across the entire industry. The last model bearing the SPARCstation name was the SPARCstation 4. The workstation series was replaced by the Sun Ultra series in 1995; the next Sun server generation was the Sun Enterprise line introduced in 1996.

== Models ==
Desktop and deskside SPARCstations and SPARCservers of the same model number were essentially identical systems, the only difference being that systems designated as servers were usually "headless" (that is, configured without a graphics card and monitor), and were sold with a "server" rather than a "desktop" OS license. For example, the SPARCstation 20 and SPARCserver 20 were almost identical in motherboard, CPU, case design and most other hardware specifications.

Most desktop SPARCstations and SPARCservers shipped in either "pizzabox" or "lunchbox" enclosures, a significant departure from earlier Sun and competing systems of the time. The SPARCstation 1, 2, 4, 5, 10 and 20 were "pizzabox" machines. The SPARCstation SLC and ELC were integrated into Sun monochrome monitor enclosures, and the SPARCstation IPC, IPX, SPARCclassic, SPARCclassic X and SPARCstation LX were "lunchbox" machines.

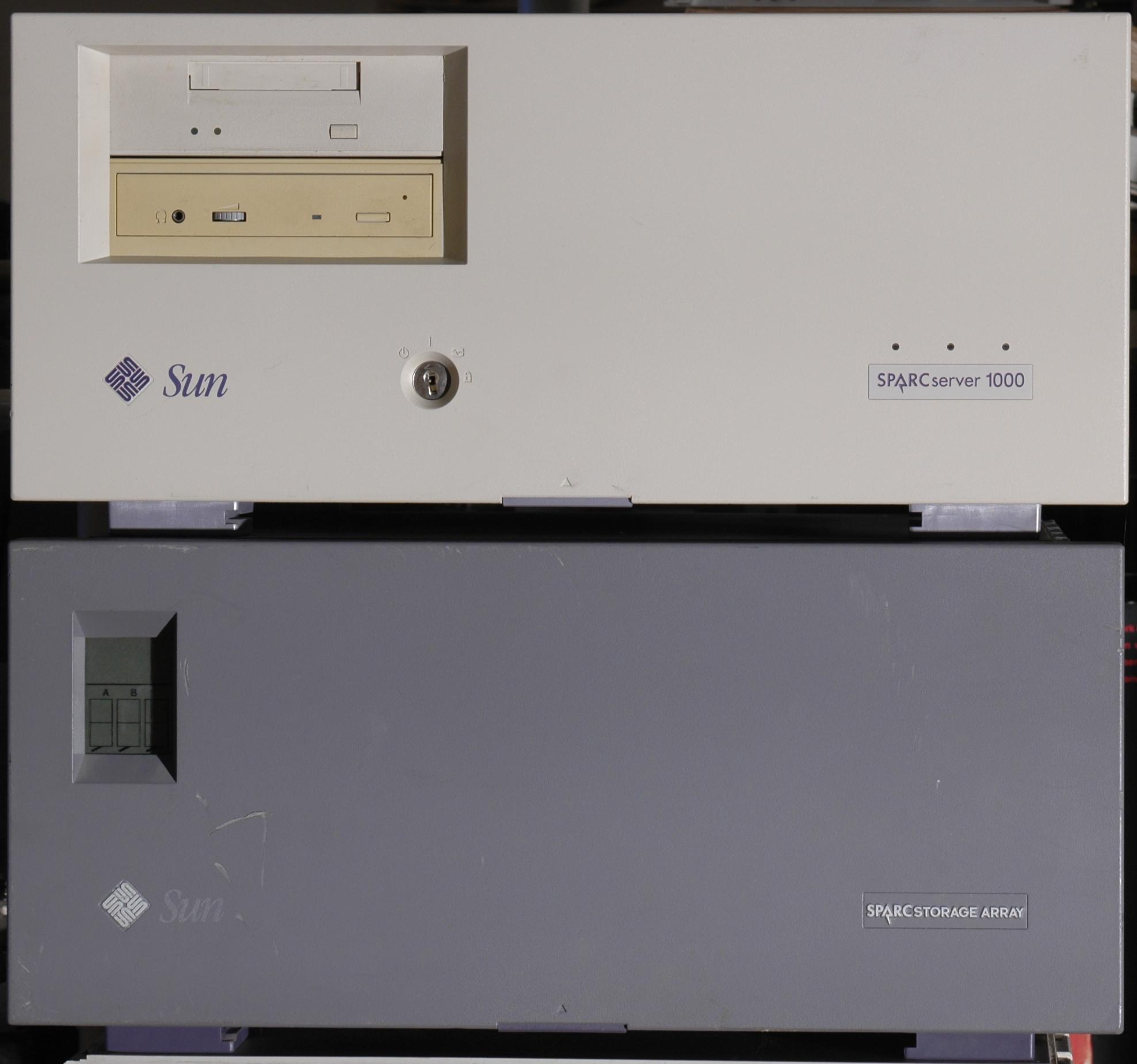
SPARCserver 1000 and SPARC Storage Array disk array

SPARCserver models ending in "30" or "70" were housed in deskside pedestal enclosures (respectively 5-slot and 12-slot VMEbus chassis); models ending in "90" and the SPARCcenter 2000 came in rackmount cabinet enclosures. The SPARCserver 1000's design was a large rack-mountable desktop unit.

Later versions of the SPARCstation series, such as the SPARCstation 10 and 20, could be configured as multiprocessor systems as they were based on the MBus high-speed bus. These systems could accept one or two single or dual central processing units packaged in MBus modules.

Until the launch of the SPARCserver 600MP series, all SPARCstation/server models were also assigned Sun 4-series model numbers. Later models received S-prefix model numbers.

Models are listed within their category in approximately chronological order.

Models
Name	Form factor	Model	Codename	Platform	CPU	CPU bus	CPU MHz	RAM (max)	Announced	End of Sales	End of Support
SPARCstation 1	Pizzabox	4/60	Campus	sun4c	Fujitsu MB86901A or LSI L64801	—	20 MHz	64 MB	April 1989		May 1999
SPARCstation 1+	Pizzabox	4/65	Campus B	sun4c	LSI L64801	—	25 MHz	64 MB	May 1990		May 1999
SPARCstation 2	Pizzabox	4/75	Calvin	sun4c	Cypress CY7C601 or Weitek SPARC POWER μP WTL 8601	—	40, 80 MHz	64 MB	Nov 1990		Dec 1999
SPARCstation 10	Pizzabox	S10	Campus-2	sun4m	SuperSPARC I/II or Ross hyperSPARC	—	33-200 MHz	512 MB	May 1992	Oct 1994	Oct 1999
SPARCstation 20	Pizzabox	S20	Kodiak	sun4m	SuperSPARC I/II or Ross hyperSPARC	—	50-200 MHz	512 MB	Mar 1994		Sep 1997
SPARCstation 5	Pizzabox	S5	Aurora	sun4m	microSPARC II or Fujitsu TurboSPARC	—	70-170 MHz	256 MB	Mar 1994		Dec 1998
SPARCstation 4	Pizzabox	S4	Perigee	sun4m	microSPARC II	—	70-110 MHz	160 MB	Feb 1995		Jul 1997
SPARC Xterminal 1 (Note: The SPARC Xterminal 1 was an X terminal, using the same enclosure as the SPARCstation 4, but a different motherboard. A board-swap upgrade to a SPARCstation 4 was also sold.)	Pizzabox	S114	Perigee	sun4m	microSPARC	—	50 MHz	128 MB	Feb 1995		
SPARCstation IPC	Lunchbox	4/40	Phoenix	sun4c	Fujitsu MB86901A or LSI L64801	—	25 MHz	48 MB	Jul 1990		Dec 1999
SPARCstation IPX	Lunchbox	4/50	Hobbes	sun4c	Fujitsu MB86903, Weitek W8701, or Weitek SPARC POWER μP WTL 8601	—	40-80 MHz	64 MB	Jul 1991		May 2000
SPARCclassic (Note: The SPARCclassic was originally to be called the SPARCstation LC but was renamed shortly before launch to avoid confusion with the SPARCstation ELC.)	Lunchbox	4/15	Sunergy	sun4m	microSPARC	—	50 MHz	128 MB	Nov 1992	May 1995	May 2000
SPARCstation LX	Lunchbox	4/30	Sunergy	sun4m	microSPARC	—	50 MHz	128 MB	Nov 1992	Jul 1994	Jul 1999
SPARCclassic X (Note: The SPARCclassic X was a stripped-down SPARCclassic (no hard drive or diskette drive, and only 4 or 8 MB of memory) sold as an X terminal. Kits were sold to upgrade it to a SPARCclassic.)	Lunchbox	4/10	Hamlet	sun4m	microSPARC	—	50 MHz	96 MB	Jul 1993	May 1995	May 2000
SPARCstation ZX	Lunchbox	4/30	Sunergy	sun4m	microSPARC	—	50 MHz	96 MB	Aug 1993		March 1994
SPARCstation SLC	All in one	4/20	Off-Campus	sun4c	Fujitsu MB86901A, LSI L64801 or LSI LSIS1C0007	—	20 MHz	16 MB	May 1990		Nov 1996
SPARCstation ELC	All in one	4/25	Node Warrior	sun4c	Fujitsu MB86903 or Weitek W8701	—	33 MHz	64 MB	Jul 1991		Oct 1998
SPARCstation Voyager	All in one	S240	Gypsy	sun4m	microSPARC II	—	60 MHz	80 MB	Mar 1994	Dec 1995	Dec 2000
SPARCserver 330	Server	4/330	Stingray	sun4	Cypress CY7C601	—	25 MHz	72 MB			
SPARCserver 370	Server	4/370	Stingray	sun4	Cypress CY7C601	—	25 MHz	72 MB			
SPARCserver 390	Server	4/390	Stingray	sun4	Cypress CY7C601	—	25 MHz	72 MB			
SPARCserver 470	Server	4/470	Sunray	sun4	Cypress CY7C601	—	33 MHz	96 MB			
SPARCserver 490	Server	4/490	Sunray	sun4	Cypress CY7C601	—	33 MHz	96 MB			
SPARCserver 630MP	Server	S630	Galaxy	sun4m	Up to four Cypress CY7C601 or SuperSPARC I	MBus	40, 50, 60 MHz	1 GB	Sep 1991		
SPARCserver 670MP	Server	S670	Galaxy	sun4m	Up to four Cypress CY7C601 or SuperSPARC I	MBus	40, 50, 60 MHz	2.5 GB	Sep 1991		
SPARCserver 690MP	Server	S690	Galaxy	sun4m	Up to four Cypress CY7C601 or SuperSPARC I	MBus	40, 50, 60 MHz	3.5 GB	Sep 1991		
SPARCserver 1000/1000E	Server	S1000	Scorpion	sun4d	Up to eight SuperSPARC I/II	XDBus ×1	40, 50, 60, 85 MHz	2 GB			
SPARCcenter 2000/2000E	Server	S2000	Dragon	sun4d	Up to 20 SuperSPARC I/II	XDBus ×2	40, 50, 60, 85 MHz	5 GB			
Cray Superserver CS6400	Server	CS6400	SuperDragon	sun4d	Up to 64 SuperSPARC I/II	XDBus ×4	60, 85 MHz	16 GB			

Note that the above configurations were those supported by Sun Microsystems. Various third-party processor upgrades were available for SPARCstation/server systems, for instance the 80 MHz Weitek POWER μP for the SPARCstation 2 or IPX, or the Ross hyperSPARC MBus modules rated at clock speeds up to 200 MHz. As mentioned above, some models listed as SPARCstations were also available in SPARCserver configuration and vice versa.

The CS6400 was developed by an outside group working cooperatively with, rather than competitively against, Sun Microsystems; as a result, although sold by Cray Research as the Cray Superserver 6400, all of its components had Sun OEM part numbers and the machine was documented in Sun's System Handbook. In 1996, when Cray Research was bought by Silicon Graphics, the CS6400 development group was sold to Sun, and released the 64-processor Sun Ultra Enterprise 10000 "Starfire" the following year.
