= Sun-4 =

Series of Unix workstations and servers

Sun-4 is a series of Unix workstations and servers produced by Sun Microsystems, first appearing in July 1987, with the launch of the Sun 4/260. The original Sun-4 series were VMEbus-based systems similar to the earlier Sun-3 series, but employing microprocessors based on Sun's own SPARC V7 RISC architecture in place of the 68k family processors of previous Sun models.

Sun 4/280 was a base system used for building an early RAID prototype.

== Models ==
Models are listed in approximately chronological order.

| Model | Codename | CPU board | CPU | CPU MHz | Max. RAM | Chassis |
|---|---|---|---|---|---|---|
| 4/260 | Sunrise | Sun 4200 | Fujitsu SF9010 IU, Weitek 1164/1165 FPU | 16.67 MHz | 128 MB | 12-slot VME (deskside) |
| 4/280 | Sunrise | Sun 4200 | Fujitsu SF9010 IU, Weitek 1164/1165 FPU | 16.67 MHz | 128 MB | 12-slot VME (rackmount) |
| 4/110 | Cobra | Sun 4100 | Fujitsu MB86900 IU, Weitek 1164/1165 FPU (optional) | 14.28 MHz | 32 MB | 3-slot VME (desktop/side) |
| 4/150 | Cobra | Sun 4100 | Fujitsu MB86900 IU, Weitek 1164/1165 FPU (optional) | 14.28 MHz | 32 MB | 6-slot VME (deskside) |
| 4/310 | Stingray | Sun 4300 | Cypress Semiconductor CY7C601, Texas Instruments 8847 FPU | 25 MHz | 32 MB | 3-slot VME (desktop/side) |
| 4/330 | Stingray | Sun 4300 | Cypress Semiconductor CY7C601, Texas Instruments 8847 FPU | 25 MHz | 96 MB | 3-slot VME w 2 memory slots (deskside) |
| 4/350 | Stingray | Sun 4300 | Cypress Semiconductor CY7C601, Texas Instruments 8847 FPU | 25 MHz | 224 MB | 5-slot VME (desktop/side) |
| 4/360 | Stingray | Sun 4300 | Cypress Semiconductor CY7C601, Texas Instruments 8847 FPU | 25 MHz | 224 MB | 12-slot VME (deskside) |
| 4/370 | Stingray | Sun 4300 | Cypress Semiconductor CY7C601, Texas Instruments 8847 FPU | 25 MHz | 224 MB | 12-slot VME (deskside) |
| 4/380 | Stingray | Sun 4300 | Cypress Semiconductor CY7C601, Texas Instruments 8847 FPU | 25 MHz | 224 MB | 12-slot VME (rackmount) |
| 4/390 | Stingray | Sun 4300 | Cypress Semiconductor CY7C601, Texas Instruments 8847 FPU | 25 MHz | 224 MB | 16-slot VME (rackmount) |
| 4/470 | Sunray | Sun 4400 | Cypress Semiconductor CY7C601, Texas Instruments 8847 FPU | 33 MHz | 768 MB | 16-slot VME (deskside) |
| 4/490 | Sunray | Sun 4400 | Cypress Semiconductor CY7C601, Texas Instruments 8847 FPU | 33 MHz | 768 MB | 12-slot VME (rackmount) |

In 1989, Sun dropped the "Sun-4" name for marketing purposes in favor of the SPARCstation and SPARCserver brands for new models, although early SPARCstation/server models were also assigned Sun-4-series model numbers. For example, the SPARCstation 1 was also known as the Sun 4/60. This practice was phased out with the introduction of the SPARCserver 600MP series in 1991. The term Sun-4 continued to be used in an engineering context to identify the basic hardware architecture of all SPARC-based Sun systems.

Sun 4/110, 4/150, 4/260 and 4/280 systems upgraded with the Sun 4300 CPU board (as used in the SPARCserver 300 series) were referred to as the 4/310, 4/350, 4/360 and 4/380 respectively.

== Sun-4 architecture ==
The Sun-4 architecture refers to the VME-based architecture described above and used in the Sun 4/100, 4/200, SPARCserver 300 and SPARCserver 400 ranges. Sun-4 support was included in SunOS 3.2 onwards and Solaris 2.1 to 2.4. OpenBSD and NetBSD also will run on the Sun-4 architecture families.

Several variations on the Sun-4 architecture were subsequently developed and used in later computer systems produced by Sun and other vendors. (The letter suffix was chosen based on the machine's system bus.) The variations comprised:

Sun-4c
(c presumably for Campus, the codename of the first Sun-4c model, the SPARCstation 1) This desktop workstation/low-end server variant substituted the 32-bit SBus expansion bus in place of VME and introduced a new MMU design. Supported by SunOS 4.0.3c onwards and Solaris 2.0 to 7.
Sun-4e
A hybrid Sun-4c/VME architecture found in the SPARCengine 1 (Sun 4/E) VME embedded controller. This board was originally designed by Force Computers and licensed to Sun. Supported by SunOS 4.0.3e and 4.1e and Solaris 2.1 to 2.4.
Sun-4m
Originally a multiprocessor Sun-4 variant, based on the MBus processor module bus introduced in the SPARCserver 600MP series. The Sun-4m architecture later also encompassed non-MBus uniprocessor systems such as the SPARCstation 5, utilizing SPARC V8-architecture processors. Supported by SunOS 4.1.2 onwards and Solaris 2.1 to 9. SPARCserver 600MP support was dropped after Solaris 2.5.1.
Sun-4d
(d for Dragon, the codename of the SPARCcenter 2000) A high-end multiprocessor architecture, based on the XDBus processor interconnect, scalable up to 20 processors. The only Sun-4d systems produced by Sun were the SPARCserver 1000 and SPARCcenter 2000 series. The Cray CS6400 was also nominally a Sun-4d machine (sun4d6), although it required a custom version of Solaris. Supported by Solaris 2.2 to 8.
Sun-4u
(u for Ultra Port Architecture) This variant introduced the 64-bit SPARC V9 processor architecture and UPA processor interconnect first used in the Sun Ultra series. Supported by 32-bit versions of Solaris from the version 2.5. The first 64-bit Solaris release for Sun4u is Solaris 7. UltraSPARC I support was dropped after Solaris 9. Solaris 10 supports Sun4u implementations from UltraSPARC II to UltraSPARC IV.
Sun-4u1
Sometimes used to identify the Sun Enterprise 10000 (Starfire) 64-way multiprocessor server architecture. The Starfire is supported by Solaris 2.5.1 onwards.
Sun-4us
A variant of Sun-4u specific to Fujitsu PRIMEPOWER systems based on SPARC64 V processors.
Sun-4v
(v for "virtual") A variation on Sun-4u which includes hypervisor processor virtualization, introduced in the UltraSPARC T1 (Niagara) multithreading processor. Supported by Solaris version 10 starting from release 3/05 HW2, and Solaris 11.
