= Pizza-box form factor =

Style of computer or other device case

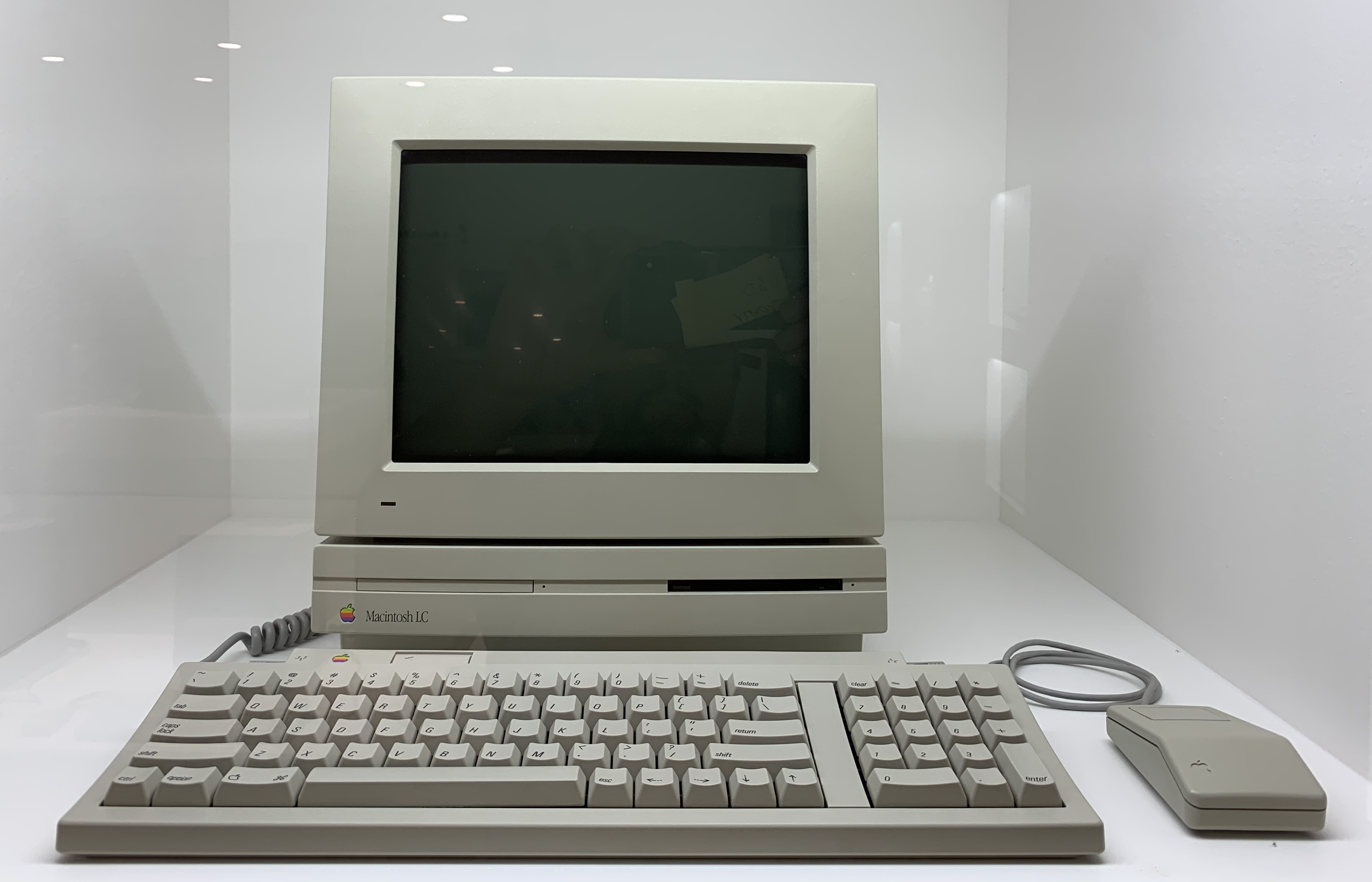
Macintosh LC with the common setup of the monitor placed on top of it

In computing, a pizza box is a style of case design for desktop computers or network switches. Pizza box cases tend to be wide and flat, normally 1.5 to 4 in or 4 to 10 cm in height, resembling pizza delivery boxes and thus the name. This is in contrast to a tower system, whose case height is much greater than the width and has an "upright" appearance. In modern usage, the term "pizza box" is normally reserved for very flat cases with height no more than 2 inches (51 mm), while those taller than two inches are referred to as desktop cases instead.

The common setup of a pizza box system is to have the display monitor placed directly on top of the case, which serves as a podium to elevate the monitor more towards the user's eye level, and to have other peripherals placed in front and alongside the case. Occasionally, the pizza box may be laid on its sides in a tower-like orientation.

== History ==
With the tagline "Who just fit mainframe power in a pizza box?" in a 1991 advertisement for its Aviion Unix server products, Data General was an early adopter of the expression in advertising, returning to the theme on later occasions. However, such usage was preceded by other occurrences of the expression in print, notably Time's 1989 coverage of Sun Microsystems and its SPARCstation 1 product. The expression was reportedly already in use as early as 1987 to refer to the profile of an expansion unit for the Digital Equipment Corporation VAXmate.

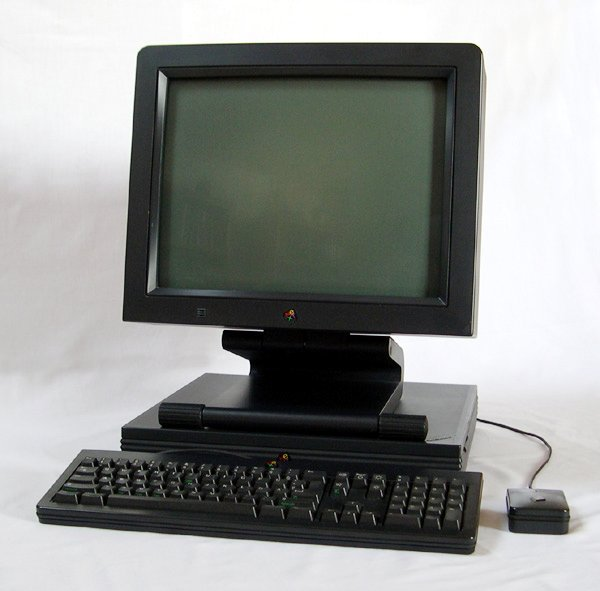
A NeXTstation workstation (2.52 in (6.4 cm) high) sits flat under a 17 in (43 cm) CRT monitor, 1990.

Most computers generally referred to as pizza box systems were high-end desktop systems such as Sun's workstations of the 1990s. Other notable examples have been among the highest-performing desktop computers of their generations, including the SGI Indy, the NeXTstation, and the Amiga 1000.

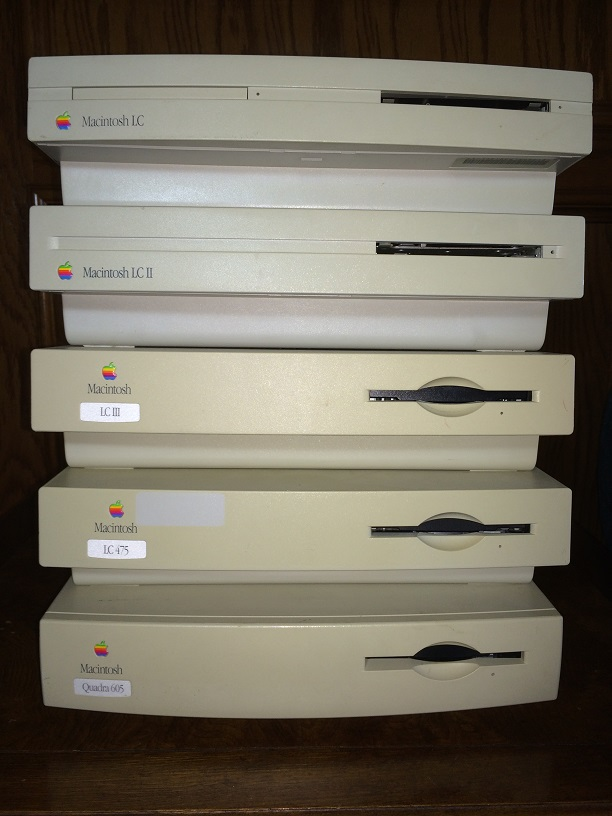
The LC family (LC, II, III, 475, Quadra 605) stacked in storage

The pizza box form factor was also seen in budget and lower-end lines such as the Macintosh LC family, which was popular in the education market.

The original SPARCstation 1 design included an expansion bus technology, SBus, expressly designed for the form factor; expansion cards were small, especially in comparison to other expansion cards in use at the time such as VMEbus, and were mounted horizontally instead of vertically. PC-compatible computers in this type of case typically use the PCI expansion bus and are usually either a) limited to one or two horizontally placed expansion cards or b) require special low-profile expansion cards, shorter than the PCI cards regular PCs use.

The density of computing power and stackability of pizza box systems also made them attractive for use in data centers. Systems originally designed for desktop use were placed on shelves inside of 19-inch racks, sometimes requiring that part of their cases be cut off for them to fit. Since the late 1990s, pizza boxes have been a common form factor in office cubicles, schools, data centers or industrial applications, where desktop space, rack room and density are critical. Servers in this form factor, as well as higher-end Ethernet switches, are now designed for rack mounting. Rack mount 1U computers come in all types of configurations and depths.

The pizza box form factor for smaller personal systems and thin clients remains in use well into the 21st century, though it is increasingly being superseded by laptops, nettops or All-in-One PC designs that embed the already size-reduced computer onto the keyboard or display monitor.

== See also ==
- Desktop form factor
