= Reverse Address Resolution Protocol =

Obsolete computer networking protocol

The Reverse Address Resolution Protocol (RARP) is an obsolete computer communication protocol used by a client computer to request its Internet Protocol (IPv4) address from a computer network, when all it has available is its link-layer or hardware address, such as a MAC address. The client broadcasts the request and does not need prior knowledge of the network topology or the identities of servers capable of fulfilling its request.

RARP has been rendered obsolete by the Bootstrap Protocol (BOOTP) and the modern Dynamic Host Configuration Protocol (DHCP), which have much greater feature sets than RARP.

RARP requires one or more server hosts to maintain a database of mappings of link-layer addresses to their respective protocol addresses. MAC addresses need to be individually configured on the servers by an administrator. RARP is limited to serving only IP addresses.

Reverse ARP differs from the Inverse Address Resolution Protocol (InARP), which is designed to obtain the IP address associated with a local Frame Relay data link connection identifier. InARP is not used in Ethernet.

== History ==
The Reverse Address Resolution Protocol (RARP) was introduced in the early 1980s to help devices, especially diskless workstations, determine their IP addresses using only their hardware (MAC) addresses. This was a common need in early network environments where local storage was unavailable for IP configuration.

RARP was specified in RFC 903, published in June 1984 by David C. Plummer. Building on the original Address Resolution Protocol (ARP), RARP reused ARP’s message structure but reversed its function, allowing a device to query a RARP server for its corresponding IP address. The protocol was widely adopted in UNIX-based systems for network booting.

Despite its utility, RARP had major limitations: It required static mappings, lacked support for additional configuration data, and could not operate across subnets. These drawbacks led to its replacement by more robust protocols like BOOTP and DHCP. Nonetheless, RARP laid the groundwork for later network boot technologies.

== Modern day uses ==
Although the original uses for RARP have been superseded by different protocols, some modern-day protocols use RARP to handle MAC migration, particularly in virtual machines, using a technique originating in QEMU.

Examples include:

- Cisco's Overlay Transport Virtualization (OTV). RARP is used to update the layer 2 forwarding tables when a MAC address moves between data centers.
- VMware vSphere's vMotion. RARP is used when a VM MAC moves between hosts.

== See also ==
- Maintenance Operations Protocol (MOP)
