= Weitek =

American chip-design company

Weitek Corporation
- Type: Private
- Industry: Semiconductors
- Founded: 1981
- Defunct: 1996
- Fate: 1996 acquired by Rockwell's Semiconductor Systems
- Headquarters: San Jose, California
- Products: microprocessors, chipset

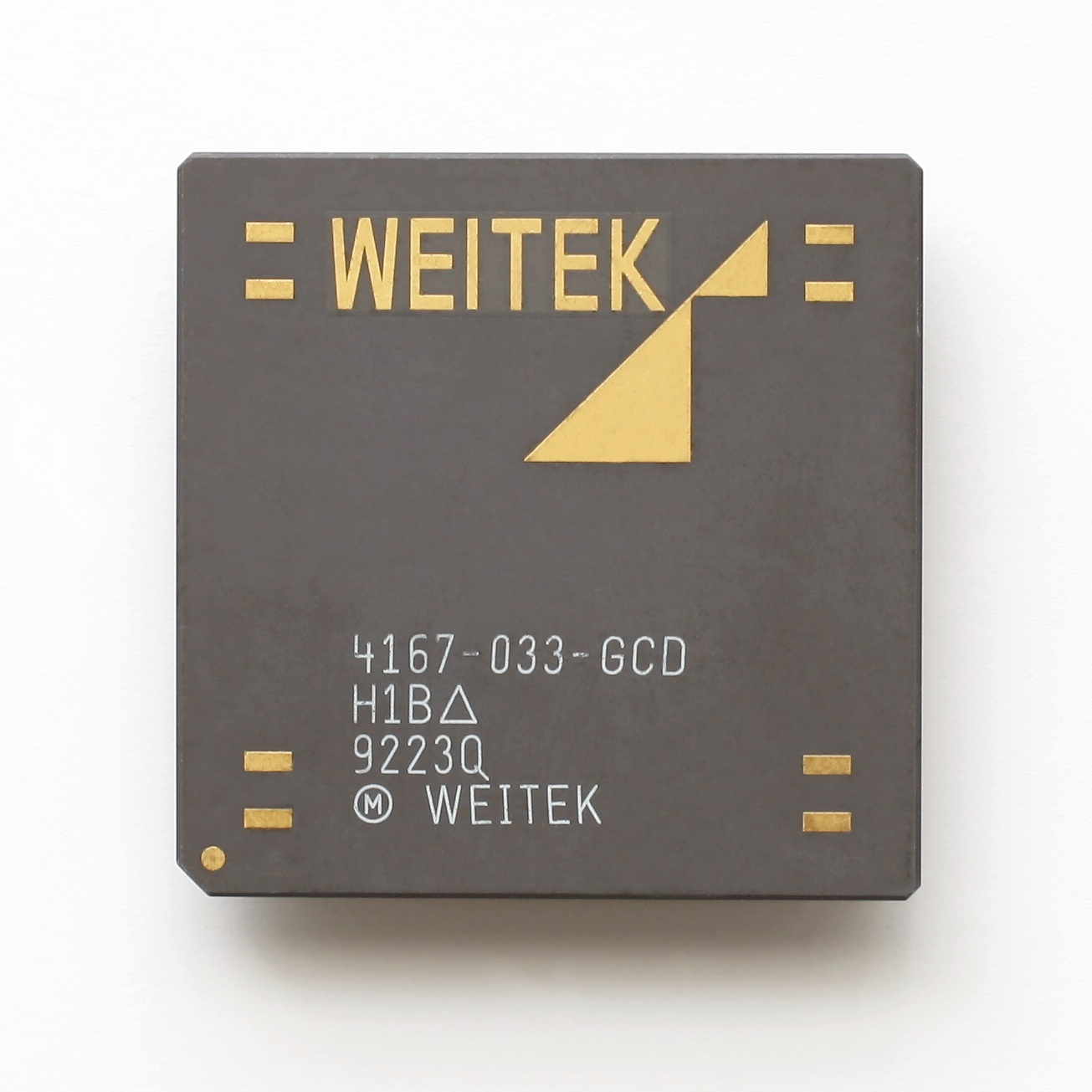
Weitek 4167 for i486-based computers

Architecture of Weitek's WTL 1167

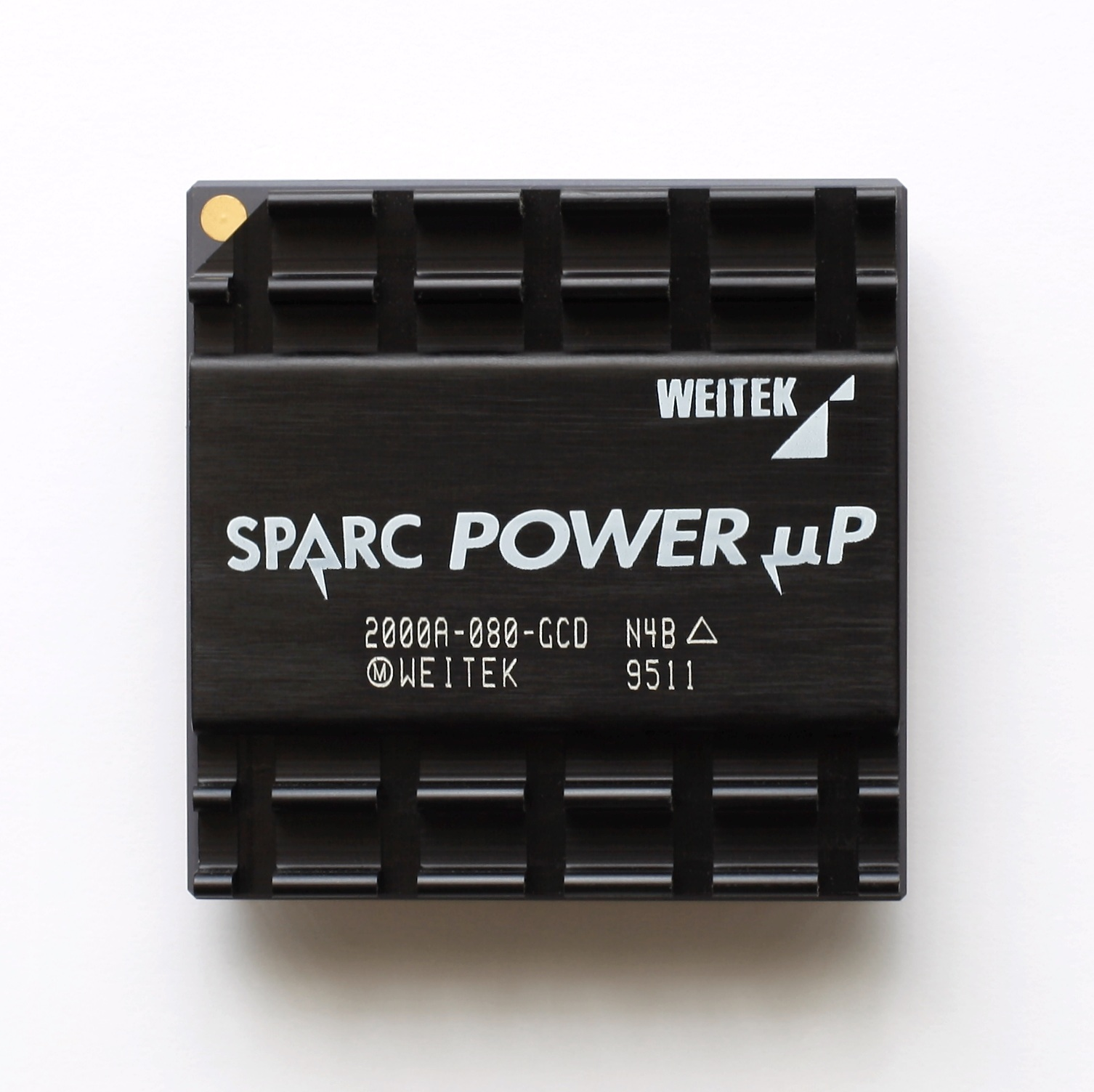
Weitek SPARC Power μP

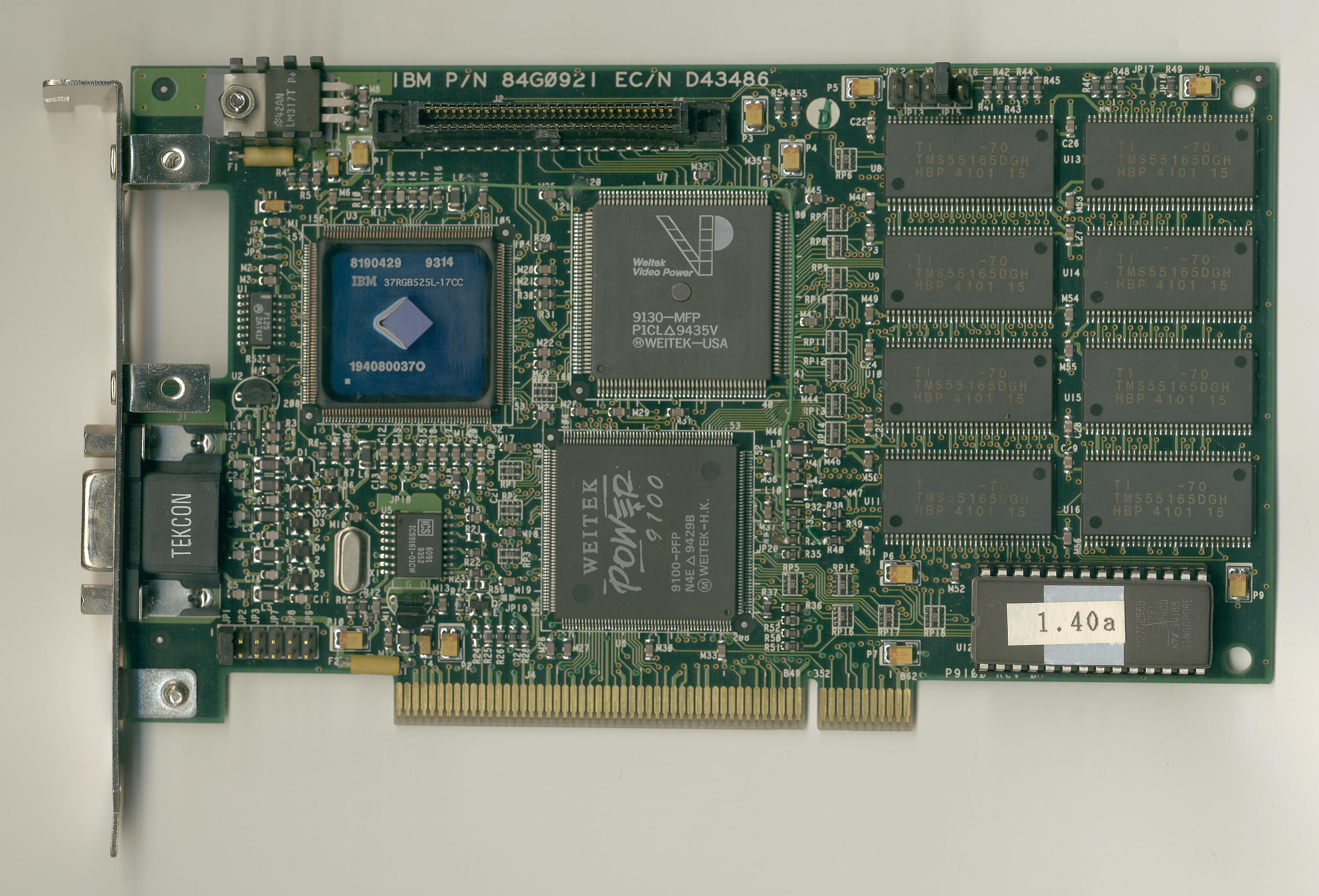
Weitek Power9100

Weitek Corporation was an American chip-design company that originally focused on floating-point units for a number of commercial CPU designs. During the early to mid-1980s, Weitek designs could be found powering a number of high-end designs and parallel-processing supercomputers.

Weitek started in 1981, when several Intel engineers left to form their own company. Weitek developed math coprocessors for several systems, including those based on the Motorola 68000 family, the WTL 1064 and 1164, and for Intel-based i286 systems, the WTL 1067. The 1067 was physically implemented as three chips, the WTL 1163, 1164 and 1165. When Intel's own FPU design for the i386 fell far behind in development, Weitek delivered the 1167 for it in the form of a daughtercard. Improvements in chip manufacturing allowed this to be reduced to a single-chip version, the WTL 2167. The WTL 3167 of 1988, also known as the Abacus, extended the system for use in Intel 80386 systems, and finally the WTL 4167 in 1989 for the Intel 80486 which used the 486's larger socket format and ran at higher clock rates than the 3167 to provide higher performance of around 4 MFLOPS for single precision.

Weitek would later outfit FPUs to the early SPARC architecture such as the 3170 and 3172. Weitek FPUs had several differences compared to x87 offerings, lacking extended double precision but having a register-file rather than a stack-based model, or using memory-mapped I/O as opposed to port-mapped I/O.

As orders increased for supercomputer applications, Weitek found itself seriously disadvantaged by its fab, which was becoming rather outdated. HP approached it with a deal to use its newer fabs. This proved advantageous for both, and soon HP's fabs were open to anyone. Weitek also worked with HP on the design of its latest PA-RISC design and sold its version known as the XL-RISC 8200, which was sold as an embedded design and had some use in laser printers. In these roles, the company referred to the systems as "HyperScript Processor"s, referring to the PostScript rendering engine.

In the late 1980s Weitek saw a new opportunity and started developing frame buffers for Sun Microsystems workstations. In the early 1990s it also introduced the SPARC POWER μP (as in "power-up"), a pin-compatible version of the SPARC processor. The μP could be dropped into existing SPARCstation 2 and SPARCstation IPX workstations and ran at 80 MHz, double the clock speed of the CPUs it replaced. The chip ran twice as fast internally, providing a boost of about 50–60% in overall speed, due to the bus not getting any faster. However, it did not pursue this concept with later generations of SPARC processors.

Weitek turned its frame-buffer experience to the PC market in the early 90s and introduced a series of SVGA multimedia chipsets under the "POWER" moniker. Consisting of two chips, one performing the GUI graphics acceleration named P9000, and another handling basic VGA operations (either Weitek's own 5186 or 5286, or an Oak OTI-087X), the POWER series was used in a number of third-party designs based on the VESA Local Bus standard. Later on, PCI cards using the P9000 were released, by adding the P9001 VLB-to-PCI bridge chip. The final generation, the P9100, combined the operations of all the chips into a single one. Weitek adapters were fairly successful in the early days of the 486 market, but fell from use when less expensive systems were introduced by a host of new players in the mid-1990s. A couple of versions were also released for the Amiga and used its ReTargetable Graphics standard.

During the early 1990s, most CPU designs started including FPUs built into the system, basically "for free", and Weitek made a series of attempts to re-enter the low-end CPU and graphics driver market with its W464 (486) and W564 (P5) systems, which used the host machine's RAM as the frame buffer to lower costs. By 1995, the company was almost dead, and in late 1996, Rockwell's Semiconductor Systems purchased the remains and quickly disappeared.

== See also ==
- Ross Technology
