= List of computer technology code names =

Following is a list of code names that have been used to identify computer hardware and software products while in development. In some cases, the code name became the completed product's name, but most of these code names are no longer used once the associated products are released.

== Symbol and numbers ==
- 19H1 — Windows 10 version 1903
- 4Course — Sun 4 × 1.05 GB 3.5" SCSI2 disks in Dinnerbox+ package
- 83% — UHU Linux 1.1 Beta 4

== A ==
- Alder — Windows CE 2.0
- Apollo — Windows Phone 8
- Astro — Android 0.9 (internal codename)
- Aurora — Windows Small Business Server 2011 Essentials
- Aurora — Sun SPARCstation 5

== B ==
- B52 Rock Lobster — Amiga 500
- Baikal — ASP Linux 7.2
- Bali — BL440ZX
- Bali — Sun JavaEngine 1
- Bamboo — Mandrake Linux 9.1
- Banias — Intel 1st generation Pentium M processors
- Banister — Intel 440MX
- Bantam — Sun SBus FDDI
- Barak — StartCom Linux 4.0.0-AS
- Barcelona — AMD Opteron "K10" architecture
- Barney — Sun StorEdge T3 chassis
- Barracuda — Opera 11.10 browser (Also A hard drive series from Seagate)
- Bart — Sun SPARCCompilers 5.x
- Barton — AMD Athlon XP
- Batman — Sun ATM SBus card
- Batphone — Sun SBus card for ISDN
- Beagle — Novell Linux desktop search and metadata technology due with SLES 10
- Becks — Macintosh II
- Beetle — Sun SunRay 100
- Beefy Miracle — Fedora Linux 17
- Bender — Android 1.0/1.1 (internal codename)
- BHA — Apple Power Macintosh 7100/66 ("Butt Head Astronomer" Carl Sagan)
- Big Electric Cat — Adobe Photoshop 4.0
- Big Foot — Quantum 5.25" hard drive
- Big Sur — Apple Font Pack
- Bigfish — Sun StorEdge 9900 series
- Bigmac — Sun 100 MBit Ethernet SBus card
- BigTop — Sun SunPro 3.0 compilers
- Biltmore — Red Hat Linux 4.2
- Bimini — BI440ZX
- Birch — Microsoft Windows CE 2.11
- Bismillah — Turkix Linux 1.0
- Blackbeard — Sun PCI SCSI hardware RAID controller
- Blackbird — Macintosh IIfx
- Blackbird — PowerBook 540
- Blackbird — Sun UltraSPARC II
- Blackbird+ — Sun UltraSPARC II 250 MHz
- Blackbird LC — Macintosh PowerBook 520/520c
- Blackford — Intel 5000P chipset
- Blackjack — Sun Netra E1 PCI System Expander
- Bladerunner — nVidia GeForce 2 Ultra
- Bladerunner — Sun GUI for Jumpstart profiles
- Blaze — Sun UltraSPARC II
- Blaze — Adobe Flash CS3
- Blue — Windows 8.1
- Blue — Windows Phone 8.1
- Blue Box — Mac OS compatibility layer for Rhapsody
- Bluebird — Mandrake Linux 8.2
- Bluedog — Sun HPC ClusterTools 3.1
- Blueringer — Sun 4 MB SBus Token Ring
- Blueringer II — Sun 16 MB SBus Token Ring
- Blugu — Apple Workgroup Server 60, 80
- Bo — Debian GNU/Linux 1.3
- BOB W — Macintosh PowerBook Duo 210/230
- Bon Echo — Mozilla Firefox 2.0
- Bongo — Macintosh Performa/Power Macintosh 5200
- Bonjour — Turkix Linux 10.0a
- Bordeaux — Fedora Core 5 Linux
- Borealis — Sun cPCI QuadFastEthernet
- Borrow — Blag Linux 10000
- Braun — Sun JavaStation
- BraveHawk 200 DC3 — HP-9000 K370/K570 - 898
- Brazil — Macintosh IIvx
- Brazil 32 — Macintosh Performa 600
- BreadboxA — Sun enclosure for Netra NFS
- Breezy Badger — Ubuntu 5.10
- Brick — Aluminum MacBook Line Late 2008
- Bride of Buster — Mac OS 8.1
- Brimstone — Adobe Photoshop 2.5 for Windows
- Broadwater — Intel P965 chipset
- Broadwater G — Intel G965 chipset
- Broadway — Sun StorEdge Media Central
- Brokenboring — KDE 3.2
- Brookdale — Intel i845 chipset
- Brooklyn — Apple IIx
- Brooks — Macintosh PowerBook 160
- Brugge — MCNLive CD Linux released May 3, 2005
- Bulldozer — codename for the server and desktop processors released on October 12, 2011, by AMD
- Bullfrog — Sun 4 mm DAT with stacker
- Bullwinkle — Sun SCSI Expansion Pedestal
- Bulverde — Intel PXA270 processor
- Burnaby — XMetaL 3.0
- Buzz — Debian GNU/Linux 1.1

== C ==
- CADET — IBM 1620
- Cairo — Microsoft Windows NT 4.0
- Calais — Sun Next generation JavaStation
- Calexico — Intel PRO/Wireless 2100B
- Calistoga — Intel chipsets for Napa platforms
- Calvin — Sun SPARCStation 2
- Camaro — AMD Mobile Duron
- Cambridge — Fedora Linux 10
- Camelot — Sun product family name for Arthur, Excalibur, Morgan
- Camino — Intel i820 chipset
- Campfire — Sun Ultra Enterprise 4000 and 5000
- Campfire+ — Sun Ultra Enterprise 4500 and 5500
- Campus — Sun SPARCStation 1
- Campus+ — Sun SPARCStation 1+
- Campus2 — Sun SPARCStation 10
- Campus2+ — Sun SPARCStation 10SX and 10BSX
- Canary — Windows Mobile Smartphone 2002
- Candy — Atari 400
- Canterwood — Intel 875P chipset
- Capone — Apple System Software 7.5
- Captain Rayno — Lunar Linux 1.3.2
- Carl Sagan — Power Macintosh 7100/66
- Carmel — Intel i840 chipset
- Carmel — Sun StorEdge D2 Array
- Carrera — CPU card in Sun—3/140, 3/150, 3/160, 3/180
- Cartman — Red Hat Linux 6.1
- Casanova — Sun SPARCEngine CP1400
- Cascade0Mb — Ethernet and PCI Bus
- Cezanne — Ryzen 5000 APUs
- Cheetah — Mac OS X 10.0
- Cheetah — Sun UltraSPARC III
- Cheetah+ — Sun UltraSPARC III Cu
- Cheeze Whiz — AppleScript
- Chelan — Windows Embedded Compact 7
- Chels — Apple IIc
- Cherrystone — Sun SunFire V440/V480
- Chicago — Microsoft Windows 95
- Chilliwack — XMetaL 3.1
- Chimera — Power Macintosh 5400
- Chimera — Sun PCi II
- Chinook — Apple Workgroup Server 95
- Chivano — Intel processors
- Chrichton — Sun SPARCEngine Ultra AXmp
- Chrysalis Client — Sun skinny Solaris OS for Intel-based NC
- Cinnamon — Macintosh PowerBook Duo 210/230
- Classic — Macintosh PowerBook 100
- ClawHammer — AMD Athlon 64 S754 130 nm processor
- ClickOnce — Microsoft technology to speed application deployment in Longhorn
- Cloud — Trustix Secure Linux 2.0
- Clovertown — Intel Xeon 5300 series processors
- Cobalt — Palm OS 6
- Cobalt — initial release of Windows 11
- Cobra — Macintosh IIcx
- Cobra — Sun 4100, 4/110, 4/150
- Cobra II — Macintosh IIci
- Cocoa — Mac OS X API
- Cold Fusion — Power Macintosh 8100/80
- Colfax — Ryzen Threadripper
- Colgate — Red Hat Linux 4.0
- Colleen — Atari 800
- Colorado — Sun 150 MHz HyperSPARC HS11
- Colorado II — Sun 125 MHz HyperSPARC HS21
- Colorado III — Sun 150 MHz HyperSPARC SM151
- Colossus — SunSwift SBus
- Colt 45 — Macintosh PowerBook 145
- Columbia — Sun 4-Disk 1.3 GB IPI Elite disk tray
- Columbus — SiS 640
- Colusa — Intel i860
- Combo — Sun SPARCStorage MultiPack and MultiPack 2
- Comet — Macintosh PowerBook 2400c
- Comet — Microsoft Proxy Server 3.0
- Companion — Macintosh PowerBook Duo 2300c
- Condor — Sun 900 MB SMD disk drive
- Condor1 — G450
- Condor2 — G800
- Conroe — Intel desktop processor based on Merom
- Constantine — Fedora 12 Linux
- Converse — Macintosh PowerBook 180
- Cooker — Mandrake Linux current unstable
- Copenhagen — SOT Linux 2002
- Copland — Mac OS Rewrite (cancelled)
- Coppermine — Intel Pentium 3 180 nm processor
- Copperriver — Intel chipsets based on Grantsdale/Alderwood models
- Cornbread — Sun Netra NFS server
- Corona — Microsoft Windows Media Player 9
- Corona — Sun 19" monitor
- Cortet — Vulcan elite CPU
- Cortland — Apple IIGS
- Corvette — AMD Mobile Athlon 4
- Covington — Intel Celeron without L2 cache
- Coyote — Sun Netra st D130
- Crane — Sun CG9
- Crescendo — Sun second DOE product
- Crescendo DC-440 — HP-9000 A400-44 / rp2400
- Crescendo DC-W2 — HP-9000 A440-6X / rp2430
- Crescendo 440 — HP-9000 A500-44 / rp2450
- Crescendo 550 — HP-9000 A500-5X / rp2450
- Crescendo 650 W2 — HP-9000 A500-6X / rp2470
- Crescendo 750 W2 — HP-9000 A500-7X / rp2470
- Crestine — Intel motherboard system logic
- Crestline — Intel GM965 chipset
- Crusader — Macintosh LC/Performa/Quadra 63X/640/Power Macintosh/Macintosh Performa 62XX/63XX
- Crusoe — Transmeta processor
- Crypto — Sun encryption card
- Crystal — Sun dual channel FC PCI card
- Cuba — Sun Netra S220
- Cupcake — Android 1.5
- Curley — Sun LX/Classic I/O board
- Cyclone — Tandem NonStop RISC (Later HP NonStop)
- Cyclone — Macintosh Quadra 840av
- Cyclone — Sun 19" monitor
- Cyclone — Sun Solstice Corporate Client

== D ==
- Dagwood — Sun
- Daktari — Sun SunFire V880
- Dapper Drake — Ubuntu 6.06 LTS
- Dark Matter — Adobe Photoshop CS
- Dart LC — Macintosh PowerBook 165
- Dartanian — Macintosh PowerBook 180
- Darth Vader — College Linux 2.3
- Darwin — Macintosh Quadra 900
- Darwin — Low-Level Unix layer of Mac OS X
- Darwin — Sun PCI-based Ultra workstations
- Daybreak — Linux Multi-Disk Howto 0.17
- Dayton — Yellow Dog Linux 2.3
- Daytona — Microsoft Windows NT 3.51
- DBLite — Macintosh PowerBook Duo 210/230
- Decaf — Sun 14" monitor
- Deepcove — XMetaL Author 4.0
- Deepmind — Respond.com
- Deerfield — Intel processors due 2003
- dejaVu — Sun PC file viewer
- Delorean — Sun 72" StorEdge Expansion Cabinet
- Derringer — Macintosh PowerBook 100
- Deschutes — Intel Pentium 2
- Detroit — Microsoft Windows 95's cancelled successor
- Deuterium — Sun Ultra 60
- Devel — Arch Linux 0.4
- Diamond — Sun cPCI FC dual port adapter
- Diana — Apple IIe
- Diesel — Adobe Flash CS4
- Dilbert — Sun SCSI2 RAID5 Storage, StorEdge A1000, StorEdge D1000
- Dinnerbox — Sun 5 1/4" Full Height Lunchbox
- Dirty Bird — Lunar Linux 1.0
- Discovery — Sun 1.3 Gb SCSI disk
- Discus — Sun ???
- Dixon — Intel Mobile Pentium 2
- Dockyard — Ark Linux 1.0
- Dollhouse Simulator — The Sims
- Dolphin — Mandrake Linux 9.0
- Dolphin — GameCube
- Donut — Android 1.6
- Dothan — Intel Pentium M 700-series 90 nm processor
- Dove — Macintosh IIx
- Dover — Sun next generation JavaStation
- Dobra Voda — KDE 3.2 Beta 2 ("dobra voda" is Czech for "good water")
- DR1 — Apple Rhapsody developer release 1
- DR2 — Apple Rhapsody developer release 2
- Dragon — Arch Linux 0.4
- Dragon — Sun SPARCServer 2000
- Dragon+ — Sun SPARCCenter 2000E
- DragonHawk U+ 240 — HP-9000 K380/K580
- Dublin — Sun Ultra Enterprise E150
- Duo — an intel CPU core specification
- Duracell — Sun PDB 1.2 on Ultra Enterprise 2
- Duraflame — Sun Ultra Enterprise 3000
- Duraflame+ — Sun Ultra Enterprise 3500
- Durango — Xbox One
- Dyne:trax — dyne:bolic Linux 1.2 and 1.3

== E ==
- Eagle — Apple Hard Disk 400SC
- Eagle — Sun UltraSPARC IIep
- Eagle Ridge — XMetaL Author 4.0 SP4
- East Fork — Intel digital home PC platform
- Echo Lake — XMAX (XMetaL for ActiveX) 4.0
- Eclair — Android 2.0/2.1
- Eclipse — Macintosh Quadra 900
- Edgy Eft — Ubuntu
- Edison — C++ Builder for MobileSet
- Egret — Sun SBus frame buffer
- Eierspass — grml Linux 0.4
- Eiger —
- Eight Ball — Macromedia Flash 8
- Einstein — Sun Ultra 5 360/440, Ultra 10 440/480
- ELB — Macintosh Quadra 605
- Electron — Sun Ultra 1 Model 170E
- Elf — Apple IIc
- Elite I — Seagate ST41600N
- Elixir — Macintosh Performa 6300–6360
- Elmer — Apple Keyboard II
- Elsie — Macintosh LC
- Elsie — Sun SPARCPrinter EC
- Elsie III — Macintosh LC III
- Emerald — Microsoft Systems Management Server
- Emerald — Sun cPCI Dual Differential Ultra SCSI
- Emerald Bay — Intel EB440BX
- Emily — TinySofa Enterprise Linux 1.0-U2
- Emma — AMD processor for mobile devices
- Enchilada — Sun UltraSPARC IIIi
- Encompass — Sun Enterprise Manager
- Endever —
- Energizer — Sun SPARCServer 1000PDB, SPARCCenter 2000PDB
- Enigma — Red Hat Linux 7.2
- Envici — Art
- Epic — Macintosh PowerBook 1400c
- Equinox — XMetaL Author, XMetaL Developer, and XMAX (XMetaL for ActiveX) 4.6 Service Pack 1
- Erickson — Macintosh IIsi
- Escher — Macintosh PowerBook Duo 270c
- Espresso — Sun JavaStation JE
- Esprit — Macintosh Portable
- Esprit — Turbolinux 7.0S
- Esther — VIA C7
- Eszter — UHU-Linux Live 2.2
- ET — Apple IIc
- Etch — Debian GNU/Linux 4.0
- Europa — Microsoft Visual Foxpro 9.0
- Eveready — Sun E1000 dual AC power grid option
- Everest — Sun GEM FC-AL PCI card
- Everest — https://web.archive.org/web/20070928022536/http://liveeverest.vulcan.com/
- Evo 200 — Macintosh Quadra 700
- Excalibur — Power Macintosh LC 5400
- Excalibur — Sun Multiprocessor UltraSPARC III
- Ezra — Cyrix C3 processor

== F ==
- F-16 — Macintosh IIfx
- F-19 — Macintosh IIfx
- Fafnir — Macintosh SE/30
- Fairbanks — FB820
- Falcon — Microsoft Message Transaction Service
- Fanwood — Intel Itanium 2 1.6 GHz processor
- Fanwood LV — Intel low voltage Itanium 2 1.3 GHz processor
- Fast Eddy — Adobe Photoshop 2.0
- Fast Eddy — Apple built-in CD-ROM drive
- Fat Mac — Macintosh 512k
- Fat Timba — Seagate ST410800WD
- Feint — EnGarde Secure Linux 1.3.0
- Feisty Dunnart — Linux Kernel 2.6.2
- Feisty Fawn — Ubuntu 7.04
- Fernie — XMetaL Developer 4.0
- Ferrari — Sun 3/F
- Festen — Mandrake Linux 5.3
- Fester — RIAA project to announce downloads at RIAA servers
- FFB — Sun Creator
- FFB2 — Sun Creator Series 2
- FFB2+ — Sun Creator Series 3
- Fiji — FJ440ZX
- Finestra — EnGarde Secure Linux 1.0.1
- Fire — Aurox Linux 9.1
- Fireball — Google Allo
- Firefly — Arch Linux 0.3
- Firestorm — Blue Linux 1.0
- Firetruck — Sun UltraSPARC
- Fisher — Red Hat Linux 7.0.90 (reference to Carrie Fisher)
- Five Star — Mandrake Linux 9.2
- Flagship — Power Macintosh 8100/110
- Flamingo — Sun VidIO
- Flapjack — Sun Netra t1 Model 105
- Flare — Source Mage GNU/Linux 0.7
- Flipflop — Sun 3.5" floppy drive
- Flyweight — Sun Netra t1 Model 100
- Foster — Intel Xeon 180 nm processor (Pentium 4-based)
- Foster Farms — Macintosh LC II
- Four Square — Macintosh IIfx
- Fred — Apple Two-Page Monochrome Monitor
- Freeport — Macintosh SE
- Freestyle — Microsoft Windows XP Media Center Edition
- Freeze — RIAA project to remotely hang computers searching for MP3 files
- Freon — Microsoft Xbox
- Freshchoice — SunSwift PCI
- Freshchoice Lite — SunFastEthernet PCI
- Fridge — Macintosh Quadra 800
- Frogger — Apple Freedom Network
- FroYo — Android 2.2
- Fuji — Yellow Dog Linux 2.1
- Full Monty — Sun Directory Services
- Fullmoon — Sun single IP address cluster
- Fusion — Microsoft Windows XP add-ons
- Fusion — Sun UltraSPARC family
- Future — Magic Linux 1.1

== G ==
- Gaga — Chinese Linux Extension 1.1
- Galactica — Sun StorEdge L20, L40, L60
- Galaxy — Sun SPARCServer 600MP, 630MP, 670MP, 690MP
- Galiano — XMAX (XMetaL for ActiveX) 4.0 Service Pack 4
- Galibaldi — D850 GB
- Galileo — Microsoft Windows CE 3.0, Handheld PC 2000
- Galileo — Microsoft Enterprise Studio for .NET
- Galileo — Sun Ultra 10 cancelled replacement
- Gallatin — Intel Xeon MP or Pentium 4 Extreme Edition w/ 2 MB L3 cache
- Garfield — Seagate ST1480N
- Gaston 2 — Intel wireless Ethernet technology
- Gemini — Sun JavaOS 1.2
- Gemini — Sun UltraSPARC dual processor CPU due in 2004
- Gemini-64 — SCO project to adapt UnixWare to 64-bit processors
- General Protection Fault — Lunar Linux 1.4.0
- Genesis — Frugalware Linux 0.1
- Genesis — Sun GE Medical special product
- Genie — Sun browser-based tool for Solaris
- Gershwin — Mac OS 9
- Geyserville — SpeedStep
- Gideon — KDevelop 3.0
- Gingerbread — Android 2.3
- Glenwood — Intel i955X chipset
- Gobi — Cyrix processor
- Gobi — IBM 750GX processor
- Goddard — Fedora 13 Linux
- Godzilla — Sun Ultra 10 cancelled replacement
- Golden Gate — Apple IIx
- Goldfish — Apple 16" Color Monitor
- Golem — Sun JavaPC Engine RC2
- Gossamer — Power Macintosh G3
- Granite Bay — Intel E7205 chipset
- Grantsdale — Intel i915P and i915G chipsets
- Green Jade — Macintosh SE/30
- Green Thumb — TRS-80 Color Computer
- Greencreek — Intel 5000X chipset
- Greenwich — Microsoft Office 2003 real-time collaboration
- Grendelsbane — RPM Live Linux CD 0.9
- Grimoire — Sorcerer Linux current unstable
- Grimoire — Source Mage GNU/Linux current
- Grizzly — Sun SS20 with hyperSPARC
- Grover — Sun Next generation Darwin 10
- Gryphon — Microsoft Windows CE 2.01, Palm PC 1.0
- Guava — Sun PGX64
- Guinness — Macintosh Portable
- Guinness — Red Hat Linux 7.0 (reference to Alec Guinness)
- Guinness — Silicon Graphics Indy Workstation
- Gumbi — Sun QuadFastEthernet PCI
- Gumby — Apple IIGS
- Gutsy Gibbon — Ubuntu 7.10
- Gypsy — Sun SPARCStation Voyager

== H ==
- Haarlem — MCNLive CD Linux released February 13, 2005
- Hades — Annvix Linux 1.0
- Hadjaha — Gimp 1.2
- Hailstorm — Blue Linux 2.0
- HailStorm — Microsoft .Net initiative
- Hakone — OpenOffice.org 1.1.2
- Halfdome — Sun SPARCPrinter E
- Half—Dome — Apple OneScanner
- Halibut — CVS 1.10
- Halloween — Red Hat Linux 0.9
- Halo — Sun SunRay 150
- Hamlet — Sun SPARCclassic, SPARCclassic X
- Hamm — Debian GNU/Linux 2.0
- Hammer — AMD K8 architecture
- Hammerhead — Sun HPC 2.0
- Happy Meal — Sun FEPS chip
- Hardy Heron — Ubuntu 8.04 LTS
- Harpertown — Intel Xeon 5400 series processors
- Hastings — PC1066 RDRAM
- Hawaii — Sun EXB-8500
- Hawk II — Sun GT Graphics Tower
- Hawk — Sun EXB-8500
- Heckel — Seagate ST3610N
- Hedwig — Red Hat Linux 6.0
- Heidelberg — Fedora Core Linux 3
- Hekk — UHU-Linux 1.2-rc1
- Helios — Mandrake Linux 6.1
- Helium — Mandrake Linux 7.1
- Hercules — Sun 24" color HDTV monitor
- Herkules — UHU-Linux 1.2-beta0
- Hermes — Microsoft Windows CE 2.11 for Webphones
- Hoary Hedgehog — Ubuntu 5.04
- Hobbes — Sun SPARCStation IPX
- Hobo — Sun 4800b keyboard/mouse for Gypsy
- Hokusai — Macintosh PowerBook 180c
- Homer — Arch Linux 0.1
- Honeycomb — Android 3.0/3.1/3.2
- Hook 33 — Macintosh LC 550
- Hook — Macintosh Performa 550
- Hooper — Macintosh PowerBook 3400c
- Horizon — Trustix Secure Linux 2.1
- Hornet — Sun UltraSPARC I
- HotJava — Sun web browser written in Java
- Houdini — Adobe Acrobat
- Hulk Hogan — Apple A/UX 3.0
- Hummingbird — Sun StorEdge L1000
- Hurricane — Blue Linux 1.0 RC2
- Hurricane — Red Hat Linux 5.0
- Hurricane — Sun 21" monitor
- Hustenstopper — grml Linux 0.3
- Hydra — Adobe AIF Toolkit - https://web.archive.org/web/20071127101741/http://labs.adobe.com/wiki/index.php/AIF_Toolkit#Windows
- Hydra — Microsoft Windows NT 4.0 Terminal Server Edition
- Hydra — Sun 3/80
- Hydra96 — HP-9000 G70/I70/H70 - 887/897
- Hyperbolic — Power Macintosh with an Exponential x704 microprocessor

== I ==
- Ibis — Sun CG8
- ICE-T — Sun Java front-end development tool client/server C/C++ apps
- Ice Cream — SunOS 4.1.1-B
- Ice Cream Sandwich — Android 4.0
- Iceberg — BLAG Linux 30000
- ICSN.com — (I Can't Say Nothing) About.com
- Igen — Uhu Linux 2.0
- IIb — Apple IIc (book-sized)
- IIp — Apple IIc (portable)
- Ikki — Macintosh II
- Indigo — Microsoft .NET communication technologies
- Indium — Lunar Linux 1.5.0
- Infinite Improbability Drive — TransGaming WineX 3.3
- Instatower — Macintosh Performa 6400
- Interface Manager — Windows 1.0
- Intrepid Ibex — Ubuntu 8.10
- Irongate — AMD-751 chipset
- Ironsides — Sun L700 tape system
- Irwindale — Intel Xeon 90 nm processor w/ 2 MB L2 cache
- Italy — AMD Opteron 200-series 90 nm dual-core processor
- Itanium — Intel IA-64 processor
- Ivory — Sun dual channel FC-AL SBus card
- Ivy — Sun 17" entry level

== J ==
- Jackson — Hyper-Threading
- Jackson Pollock — QuickDraw 32-bit
- Jade 180 U — HP-9000 T540/T600 - 893
- Jaguar — Mac OS X v10.2
- Jaguar — Sun UltraSPARC IV
- Jaguar — Sun VME/SMD-4 disk controller
- Jalapeño — Sun ASIC for Nachos/SunVideo
- Janus — Microsoft Windows 3.1
- Jasmine — Sun 17" premium monitor
- Jason — Apple IIc
- Jasper — Sun StorEdge PCI Dual Ultra3 SCSI Adapter
- Jaunty Jackalope — Ubuntu 9.04
- Javelin — Sun 2 CPU PCI midrange workgroup server
- Jayhawk — Intel Xeon processor based on Tejas; project cancelled
- Jeckle — Sun 3.5" 535 MB disk
- Jedi — College Linux 2.1
- Jedi — Cyrix processor
- JeDI — Macintosh PowerBook 150 ("Just Did It")
- Jedy — SiS 5581/5582
- Jelly Bean — Android 4.1
- Jeeves — Sun Java-powered Internet Server software (Java Web Server)
- Jessie — Debian GNU/Linux 8.0
- Jet — Sun VX, MVX
- Jiro — Sun Project StoreX
- John — Conner CFP1080E
- John — IBM DPES-31080
- Jonah — Intel 3rd generation Pentium M core (also known as Yonah)
- Joshua — Cyrix processors
- JOT — JBA (Software Ltd) Open Toolcase
- Juhhu! — UHU Linux 1.0
- Jumanji — Sun StorEdge A7000
- Juneau — Intel JN440BX
- Junior — Alt Linux 1.1
- Junior — Alt Linux 2.0
- Jupiter — Microsoft Windows CE 2.11, Handheld PC Professional (3.0)
- Jupiter — Microsoft XML-based web services products
- Jupiter — SunOS 5.0 (Solaris 2.0)
- Janak — ja625

== K ==
- K2 — Adobe Indesign
- Kaede — Momonga Linux 1
- Kahlua — Sun 17" entry level monitor
- Kalamata — Apple silicon
- Kamion — UHU Linux 1.1
- Kanga — Macintosh PowerBook 3500
- Kangaroo — Hewlett-Packard HP-75C
- Kansas — Power Macintosh 8600 and 9600
- Karatu — Turbolinux 3.0
- Karelia — ASP Linux 10
- Karmic Koala — GNU\Linux Ubuntu 9.10
- Katana — Sega Dreamcast
- Katmai — Intel Pentium 3 250 nm processor
- Kauai — KU440EX
- Kauai — Sun KJava VM
- Kelowna — XMetaL Author 4.0 Service Pack 1
- Ketchup — UHU Linux 1.2-beta2
- Keystone — HP-9000 rp7410
- Khepri — IBM two-way processors
- Kitkat — Android 4.4
- Kkachi — WOWLinux 7.0
- Klamath — Intel Pentium 2 350 nm processor
- Klingon — Seagate ST12400N
- Kodiak — Microsoft Exchange Server
- Kodiak — Sun SPARCStation 20
- KolibriOS — Kolibri Operating System
- Kollege — KDE 3.3 Beta 2
- Kona — Seagate ST5660N
- Kong — Apple Two-Page Monochrome Monitor
- Kootenay — OEone HomeBase Linux 1.7
- Kopernicus — KDE 2.0
- Krakatoa — Sun GUI/deskset tools for JavaStation, HotJava Views
- Krans — DEC TOPS-20
- Krum — Tilix Linux 0.5
- Krups — Sun 2nd Generation JavaStation
- Kryptonite — AMD K5, K6 processors
- Kyoto — Turbolinux 1.0
- Kyrene — Intel processors

== L ==
- Lady Kenmore — Macintosh Performa 200
- Ladner — XMetaL Developer 4.0 Service Pack 1
- LaGrande — Intel's security features in new processors
- Laguna — Macintosh Portable
- Lakeport — Intel i945 chipset
- Landshark — HP 9000 PA-RISC 8600 processor PCX-W+
- LAW — Power Macintosh 7100/66 ("Lawyers Are Wimps")
- Laughlin — Fedora Linux 14
- LCA — (Low Cost Apple) Apple IIe
- LD50 — Macintosh TV
- Leadville — Sun StorEdge network foundation software
- Leary — Macintosh PowerBook 140
- Legend — SCO OpenServer 6
- Lego — Sun CG6
- LegoA — Sun GX CG6
- Leeloo — Mandrake Linux 5.2
- Lenny — Debian GNU/Linux 5.0
- Leo — Sun ZX
- Leo II — Sun ZX+
- Leonidas — Fedora Linux 11
- Leopard — Mac OS X 10.5
- Liberation — White Box Enterprise Linux 3.0
- Liberty — Sql Server 2000 (64 Bit)
- Lightweight — Sun NEBS-compliant Ultra server
- Lilac — Sun 17" premium color monitor
- Limbo — Red Hat Linux 7.3.29 / 7.3.93 / 7.3.94
- Lindenhurst — Intel Chipset
- Liquid Sky — Adobe Photoshop 7.0
- Lisa — Apple Lisa
- Little Big Mac — Macintosh II
- Littleneck — Sun SunFire 280R
- Logo — Apple Color StyleWriter Pro
- Lokar —
- Lollie — Apple IIc
- Lollipop — Android 5.1
- Lonestar — Windows XP Tablet PC 2005
- Longhorn — Windows Vista
- Longhorn Server — Windows Server 2008
- Lorax — Red Hat Linux 6.1 Beta
- Lorraine — Amiga
- Lovelock — Fedora Linux 15
- Love Shack — Macintosh Portable (backlit)
- Lucid Lynx — Ubuntu 10.04
- Lumumba — dyne:bolic Linux 1.4
- Luna — Sun JavaOS 1.1
- Lunchbox — Sun Desktop Disk Pack
- Lutra sumatrana — TA-Linux 0.2.0-rc1
- Luzon — Sun TDMA IWF for Lucent Technologies
- Lyra — K-DEMar Linux 2.2

== M ==
- M2 — Macintosh PowerBook 5300
- M64 — Sun PGX PCI 8-bit color
- Mac ± — Macintosh SE
- Macallan — Microsoft Windows CE 5.0
- Maccabbee — StartCom Linux 3.0.1-AS
- Mach5 — PowerPC 604e
- Macintosh — Macintosh
- Macintosh IIce — Macintosh Quadra 700
- Macintosh IIex — Macintosh Quadra 900
- Macintosh IIvm — Macintosh Performa 600
- Macintosh IIxi — Macintosh IIfx
- MACIO — Sun Ethernet, Parallel and SCSI ASIC chip
- Mad Hatter — Sun Java Desktop
- Madison — IBM x450 server
- Madison — Intel Itanium 2 130 nm processor w/ up to 6 MB L3 cache
- Madison 9M — Intel Itanium 2 130 nm processor w/ 9 MB L3 cache
- Mafalda — Sun SunConnect OSI 8.0
- Magneto — Sun 66/33 MHz PCI bus card
- Magnolia — AMD Athlon
- Magnum — Sun Datacenter Switch 3456
- Mai Tai — Apple 12" RGB Monitor
- Main Street — Macintosh PowerBook G3/350-400
- Maipo — Red Hat Enterprise Linux 7
- Makalu — Rocks Cluster Linux 3.3.0
- Mako — Sun HPC ClusterTools 3.0
- Makrolab — Dyne:bolic GNU/Linux 1.x
- Malibu — Macintosh Portable
- Mamba — Sun 16-port FC-AL switch
- Mammoth — Sun EXB-8900
- Manchester — AMD Athlon 64 X2 dual core processor w/ 2*512 KB L2 cache
- Mango — Sun PGX32
- Mango — Windows Phone 7.5
- Manhattan — Red Hat Linux 5.1
- Manifest — White Box Enterprise Linux 4
- Manila — AMD Sempron 90 nm processor (Socket AM2 w/ DDR2-667)
- Manitoba —
- Mantaray — Sun-4/370 deskside, 12-slot pedestal system
- Marathon — Intel 2700G graphics accelerator
- Marblehead — XMAX (XMetaL for ActiveX) 4.0 Service Pack 1
- Mark Twain — Apple IIGS
- Marcato W+ — HP-9000 L3000-5X
- Mars — SunOS 5.1 (Solaris 2.1)
- Mars — Sega 32X
- Marshmallow — Android 6.0
- Mascarpone — UHU-Linux 1.2-rc3
- Master — Alt Linux 2.0
- Matterhorn — Rocks Cluster Linux 3.1.0
- Matterhorn — Sun ACL 4/52, ETL 4/1000
- Matterhorn2 — Sun ACL 4/100, ETL 4/1800, StorEdge L1800
- Matterhorn W2 750 — HP-9000 rp7410
- Matthew — Cyrix processor
- Maui — Macintosh SE
- Maui — MU440EX
- Maui — Sun EXB-8505
- MauiXL — Sun EXB-8505XL
- Maverick Meerkat — Ubuntu 10.10
- Maxcat — Sun 104-way server
- McKinley — Intel Itanium 2
- Meerkat — Sun Serengeti System Controller board
- Memphis — Microsoft Windows 98
- Menagine — Apple Workgroup Server 95
- Mending — Source Mage GNU/Linux 0.8
- Mendocino — Intel Celeron 250 nm processor with L2 cache
- Mendocino — AMD SoC for entry level with Zen 2 and RDNA2 architectures on TSMC 6 nm process
- Merced — Intel Itanium processor
- Mercury — Intel 430MX
- Mercury — Microsoft Windows CE 2.0, Handheld PC 2.0
- Mercury — Game Gear
- Mercury — Sun encryption card
- Merl —
- Merlin — Adobe Photoshop 2.5 for Mac
- Merlin — IBM OS/2 Warp 4.0
- Merlin — Hewlett-Packard HP-75D
- Merlin — Microsoft Windows CE 3.0, Pocket PC 2002
- Merlin — Sun 18.1" flat panel
- Merom — Intel Core 2 Duo Mobile processor
- Metro — Sun Visual Workshop 3.0
- Midas — Apple Trackpad 1.0
- Midnight Run — Macintosh SE
- Midway — Microsoft Xbox
- Mighty Cat — Macintosh PowerBook 2400c
- Mikey — Hitachi mini-Microdrive
- Milan — 3rd generation Epyc
- Millennium — Microsoft Windows ME
- Millennium — Sun UltraSPARC V
- Millington — Intel dual—core two-way Itanium 2 processor due mid-2005
- Milwaukee — Macintosh II
- Minnow — Sun Storedge 3310 disk array
- Mira — Microsoft Windows CE for Smart Displays (cancelled 12/2003)
- Mishteh — StartCom Linux 3.0.3-ML
- Mistral —
- Mobile Triton — Intel 430MX
- Mohawk 160 — HP-9000 K450
- Mohawk 180 — HP-9000 K460 - 889
- Mojave — Cyrix processor
- Monad — Microsoft Shell
- Monet — Macintosh PowerBook 165c
- Montana — Macintosh Classic II
- Montana — Power Macintosh 8600 and 9600
- Montara GML — Intel processors
- Monte Carlo — Sun Netra ct 800
- Montecito — Intel IA-64 processors
- Montera — Intel processors
- Monterey — SCO/IBM/Sequent Unix
- Montvale — Intel successor to Montecito processors due 2007
- Monza — Turbolinux 7W
- Mooch — Tao Linux 1.0-U3
- Moonbase — Lunar Linux current
- Moonshine — Sun backplane bus for 12 and 16 slot chassis, also Fedora 7 Linux
- Moosehead — Silicon Graphics O2 Workstation
- Morgan — AMD Duron processor
- Morgan — Sun 1-way UltraSPARC IIIi
- Moriarty — Sun System Handbook
- Moses — Mac OS X Server-Based Mac
- Mother's Day — Red Hat Linux 1.0
- Mother's Day .1 — Red Hat Linux 1.1
- Mount Prospect — Intel MP440BX
- Mousex — Lunar Linux 1.3
- Moxie — Adobe Flex 3.0
- Mozilla — Netscape Navigator (since spun off as its own name and browser)
- Mr. Coffee — Sun 1st generation JavaStation 1
- Mr. T — Macintosh Plus
- Mriya — ASP Linux 7.1
- Mucho Grande — MG8
- Mulligan — Macintosh Portable (backlit)
- Mustang — AMD processor
- Mustang — Red Hat Linux 4.9 / 4.9.1 / 4.96
- Mustang — Sun Java 2 Standard Edition 6.0 (due 2006)

== N ==
- N10 — Intel i860 processor
- N11 — Intel i860XP processor
- Nachos — SunVideo
- Nahant — Red Hat Enterprise Linux 3.94
- Nano — Lunar Linux 1.1.2
- Napa — Intel Centrino 3rd-generation
- Naples — 1st generation Epyc
- Nashville — Microsoft Windows 96 (discontinued)
- Natoma — Intel 440FX
- Natty Narwhal — Ubuntu 11.04
- Nautilus — Macintosh PowerBook 2400c
- Navigator — IBM 3174
- Nehalem — Intel's 45 nm Technology Process
- Nehemiah — Cyrix C4 processor
- Nell — Sun SBus PCMCIA adapter
- Neptune — Intel 430NX
- Neptune — Microsoft Windows 2000 Home Edition (cancelled)
- Neptune — Sun SPARCEngine EC
- Neutron — Sun Ultra 1
- Nevada — Power Macintosh 9500/180-200
- Nevada — Current development releases of Solaris
- Newcastle — AMD Athlon 64 processor with 512 KB L2 cache
- Newton — Progeny Linux 1.0
- Niagara — Sun UltraSPARC 8-processor CPU, successor to Gemini, due in 2005
- Niagra — Sun Tape Backup Tray
- Nickel — Windows 11 22H2 up to 23H2
- Nighthawk — Sun TurboSPARC-based SS5
- Ninevah — Intel Ethernet chip
- Nitro — Power Macintosh 8500/120
- Nitro — Nintendo DS
- Nocona — Intel 64-bit Xeon processors
- Nodewarrior — Sun SPARCstation ELC
- NoDo — "Copy&Paste" update for Windows Phone 7
- Noodle — ROOT GNU/Linux 1.3
- Nordica — Sun SPARCEngine CP1500
- North — AppleTalk Internet Router
- Northbridge — AMD-762
- Northwood — Intel Pentium 4 130 nm processor
- Nougat — Android 7.0/7.1
- Nova — Arch Linux 0.5
- Nova96 — HP-9000 G60/H60/I60
- NT 5.0 - Microsoft Windows 2000
- NuKernel — Apple kernel
- NV35 — NVidia GeForce FX 5900
- NV36 — NVidia GeForce FX 5700
- NV38 — NVidia GeForce FX 5950
- NX — Nintendo Switch

== O ==
- Oak — Sun Java
- OberoN — Linux Smart Card Howto 1.0.4
- Obi Wan — CollegeLinux 2.5
- Oceanic — Macintosh IIsi
- Odem — Intel 855PM chipset
- Odin — TinySofa Enterprise Server Linux 2.0
- Odyssey — Microsoft Windows 2000's cancelled successor
- Odyssey — Mandrake Linux 7.2
- Odyssey — SiS 740
- Offcampus — Sun SPARCstation SLC
- Okinawa — Turbolinux 2.0
- Omega — Macintosh PowerBook 190/190c
- Oneiric Ocelot — Ubuntu 11.10
- Ootpa — Red Hat Linux 8.0
- Optimus — Macintosh LC 575
- Orbis — PlayStation 4
- Orbit — Sun SolarNet PC-X terminal software
- Orca — Sun E4000/E5000
- Oreo — Sun Netra j 3.0, Android 8.0/8.1
- Orion — Microsoft Windows CE 2.11, Palm-sized PC 1.1
- Orion — Yellow Dog Linux 4.0
- Orion DT — Intel 450KX
- Orion ST — Intel 450GX
- Orleans — AMD Athlon 64 90 nm processor (Socket AM2 w/ DDR2-667)
- OS04 — grml Linux 0.1
- Oslo — Sun QIC-2.5 GB 1/4" Tape
- Osmium — Exchange 5.5
- Osoyoos — XMetaL Author and Developer 4.0 Trial Version
- Osprey — Sun Millennium-based workgroup server
- Othello — Sun cPCI 500 MHz USIIe CPU
- Otter — Sun Ultra 5
- Owens — Sun NetDynamics Release/Rev 5

== P ==
- Pacific — Macintosh IIci
- Pacifica — AMD processor virtualizat ion features
- Palermo — AMD Sempron S754 90 nm processor
- Palladium — Microsoft Next Generation Secure Computing Base (Microsoft Codename Longhorn component)
- Palomino — AMD Athlon XP/MP 180 nm processor
- Panama — Red Hat Enterprise Linux 2.1 ES
- Panda — Sun SS20 with 75 MHz Voyager
- Panther — Mac OS X 10.3
- Panther — Sun SPARCEngine Ultra AXi
- Paramount — SuperSavage
- Paran — WOWLinux 7.1
- Paran—R2 — WOWLinux 7.3 Beta
- Parhelia — G1000
- Paris — AMD Sempron S754 130 nm processor
- Paris — Macintosh II
- Paul — Conner CFP1080S
- PBox — Sun External Expansion Module
- Peanuts — Sun low cost 207 MB disk
- Pegasus — Microsoft Windows CE 1.0
- Peju — Dell Latitude ST
- Pendolino — SmoothWall Linux 2.0 Beta 7
- Penguin — Sun PCi—based SunPC card
- Penryn — Intel Core 2 "Core architecture" 45 nm die shrink with SSE4
- Pensacola — Red Hat Linux AS 2.1 / RHEL 2.1 AS
- Perestroika — Apple A/UX 2.0
- Perigree — Sun SPARCstation 4
- Persistence — TinySofa Enterprise Linux 2.0-pre3
- Peter Pan — Macintosh TV
- Phantasmal — Source Mage GNU/Linux 0.6
- Pharaoh — StartCom Linux 3.0.0-DL
- Phiphi — LinuxTLE 4.1
- Phenom — Family of AMD processors
- Phoebe — Red Hat Linux 8.1
- Phoenix — Apple IIGS
- Phoenix — Power Macintosh LC 5420/5500
- Phoenix — Sun SPARCstation IPC
- Photon — Sun Enterprise Network Array A5000
- Picasso — Red Hat Linux 3.0.3
- Pico — Lunar Linux 1.2
- Pie — Android 9.0
- Piglet — Red Hat Linux 6.1.92
- Piglet — Sun real—time MPEG2 decoder
- Pike's Peak — Macintosh PowerBook 145B
- Piltdown Man — Power Macintosh 6100/60
- Pinball — Macintosh LC
- Pineapple — Sun PCI framebuffer/graphics for U30
- Ping—Pong — Apple OneScanner
- Pinnacle — LSI HyperSPARC chip
- Pinnacle Ridge — Ryzen 2000
- Pinstripe — Red Hat Linux 6.9.5
- Pippin — Apple IIc
- Pipeline HD — Seagate IIc
- Pismo — PowerBook G3 (version with Firewire Ports)
- Pizza — Apple IIc+
- Placer — Intel E7505 chipset
- Plano — Sun 19" monitor
- Platinum — Sun next generation Crichton
- Platte —
- Pliska — Tilix Linux 0.3
- Plumas — Intel E7500 chipset
- Plus — WOWLinux 6.1
- PlusPlus — Macintosh SE
- Pluto — Sun SPARCStorage Array Model 101, 102, 112
- Polaris — Sun3, SPARC, Sun4/E
- Pommes — ROOT GNU/Linux 1.4 Beta
- Pomona — Yellow Dog Linux 2.0
- Pooh — Sun real-time MPEG2 decoder
- Poppy — Sun 17" entry level
- Portland —
- Portola — i752
- Potato — Debian GNU/Linux 2.2
- Potomac — Intel Xeon MP
- Powderhorn — Sun StorEdge L6000
- Power Express — Power Macintosh G3 Pro
- Power Surge — Power Macintosh PCI
- Powerware — Sun SPARCWorks/Accelerator
- Precise Pangolin — Ubuntu 12.04
- Prelude — Sun Solaris/Workshop for Objects
- Prelude W — HP-9000 N4000-36
- Prelude W 440 — HP-9000 N4000-44
- Prelude W+ 550 — HP-9000 N4000-55
- Premise 500 — Macintosh Quadra 900
- Prescott — Intel Pentium 4 500 series, successor to Northwood
- Presler — Intel Pentium 4 6×1 series, successor to Prescott-2M
- Prestonia — Intel Xeon 130 nm processor
- Primus — Macintosh LC 475
- Primus — Macintosh Quadra 605
- Prism — Macintosh LC
- Private Variables — Lunar Linux 1.3.3
- Profusion — Intel processors
- Project A — TRS-80 Model 4P
- Project Alabama — Avowed (upcoming Obsidian Entertainment RPG)
- Project Atlantis — Nintendo Game Boy Advance
- Project Café — Nintendo Wii U
- Project Chess — IBM PC
- Project Ganges — ShoppingList.com
- Project K — Apple eMate 300
- Project Needlemouse — Sonic The Hedgehog 4 Episode 1
- Project Pipeline — RxCentric.com Inc.
- Project R — TRS-80 Model 4
- Project Reality — Nintendo 64
- Project X — The Sims
- Propeller — Apple IIc+
- Proton — Acorn BBC Model B "Beeb" Microcomputer.
- Psyche — Red Hat Linux 8.0
- Psycho+ — Sun UPA to PCI bus bridge
- Puberty — WOWLinux 6.2
- Puffin — Google desktop search application
- Pulsar — Sun Ultra 2
- Puma — Mac OS X 10.1
- Puppy — Name of Linux OS
- Purple — Sun RAID disk storage
- Python — Seagate ST42400ND
- P9 — Power Mac G4 Cube

== Q ==
- Q88 — Mac Mini (headless affordable mac)
- Q97 — FireWire interface for GarageBand
- QED — Sun Quad Ethernet
- Quadra 1000 — Macintosh Quadra 840av
- Quadro — Sun GX+
- Quahog — Sun E420R
- Quantal Quetzal — Ubuntu 12.10
- Quark — Sun Ultra 30
- Quasar — Sun Ultra 80
- Quattro — Windows Home Server
- QuattroXL — Sun QuadFastEthernet SBus Excel
- Queen Cake — Android 10
- Quesnel — XMetaL Author 4.5
- Quicksilver — Aurox Linux 10.1
- Quicksilver — Sun SelectMail

== R ==
* Resolute Racoon — Ubuntu 26.04
- R2 — Microsoft Windows Server 2003 R2
- Racer — Silicon Graphics Octane
- Radiance — Sun WebCT
- Raffica — Macintosh IIsi
- Raffika — Macintosh IIsi
- Rage6 — ATI Radeon 7200
- Raisin — Apple IIc+
- Rajt! — UHU-Linux 1.2
- Rambo — Apple IIGS
- Rampage —
- Raphsody DC-360 — HP-9000 L1000-36 / rp5400
- Raphsody DC-440 — HP-9000 L1000-44 / rp5400
- Raphsody 360 — HP-9000 L2000-36 / rp5460
- Raphsody 440 — HP-9000 L2000-44 / rp5450
- Rapier — Microsoft Windows CE 3.0, Pocket PC 2000
- Raptor — Apple operating system
- Raptor — IBM z800
- Raptor — Seagate ST32550N
- Raring Ringtail — Ubuntu 13.04
- Raven — IBM RS/6000 7017-S70
- Raven — Seagate ST3500N
- Raven Ridge — Ryzen APUs
- Rawhide — Red Hat Linux unstable development tree
- RayBan — Macintosh IIsi
- Razor — Sun E220R
- Rebound — Macintosh Performa 5200
- Rebound — Power Macintosh LC 5200
- Red Sar OS — North Korean Linux distribution
- Redstone — Windows 10 Anniversary Update
- Red Pill — Adobe Photoshop CS3
- Red Velvet Cake — Android 11
- Regatta — IBM p690
- Rembrandt — Red Hat Linux 3.0.4 / 3.95
- Renault — Apple File Exchange
- Reno — Macintosh II
- Replacements — Macintosh PowerBook 140
- Revolution — Nintendo Wii
- Rex — Debian GNU/Linux 1.2
- Rhapsody — Mac OS X Server 1.0 and enterprise OS
- Rialto — Sun StorEdge L280
- Richmond — XMetaL Developer 4.5
- Rincewind — VLC Media Player 2.1
- Ringo — Conner CFP2105E
- Ringo — Seagate ST32430WC
- Rio — TinySofa Classic Server Linux 1.1
- Rio de Janeiro — SOT Linux 2000R3
- Riviera — Macintosh Portable
- Road Warrior — Macintosh PowerBook 170
- Roadracer — Sun graphics card (GXi) for Sun386i
- Roadrunner — Sun386i, RR150, RR250
- Roam — Sun remote mail client
- Rochester — Intel RC440BX
- Rocky — Sun deskside system enclosure package
- Rockchip — Apad Processor chip
- Rome — Yellow Dog Linux 2.2
- Rome — 2nd generation Epyc
- Romeo — Sun SPARCEngine CP1400
- Rosebud — Macintosh PowerBook 100
- Rosebud — Sun 16" mid-range monitor
- Rost — UHU-Linux 1.2-rc2
- Roswell — Red Hat Linux 7.1.90 / 7.1.94
- Round One Inc. — epinions.com Inc.
- Royale — Macromedia Flex 1.0
- Rubicon — Power Mac G4 Cube
- Rudi — KDE 3.2

== S ==
- Sabin — Tilix Linux 1.0-Beta1
- Sabre — Sun MicroSPARC IIep
- Sabrina — Android 12/12.1
- Safari — Sun UltraSPARC III
- Sagres — Ciaxa Magica Linux 8.0
- Sahara — IBM 750FX processor
- Salem — SA820
- Samila — LinuxTLE 5.5
- Samuel — Cyrix processor
- Sandy Bridge — Second Generation Intel Core I processor
- San Diego — AMD Athlon 64/FX S939 90 nm processor
- Santa Fe — Sun telco processor enhancer
- Santa Rosa — Intel Centrino 4th-generation
- Santiago — Red Hat Enterprise Linux 6
- Sapphire — Sun UltraSPARC II
- Sara — Apple III
- Sarge — Debian GNU/Linux 3.1
- Satura — grml Linux 0.2
- Sawtooth — Apple G4 tower
- Scimitar —
- Scorpion — Sun SPARCServer 1000
- Scud — Sun DSBE/S
- Sea Lion — Sun Ultra 10
- Seam — Sun p4bus Greyscale/Mono Frame Buffer
- Seattle — Intel SE440BX
- Seattle2 — Intel SE440BX-2
- Seawolf — Red Hat Linux 7.1
- Seawolf — Sun StorEdge L180
- Serengeti — Sun Enterprise Server family
- Sevar — Tilix Linux 0.4
- Severn — aborted Red Hat Linux 10 (transferred to the Fedora project)
- Shadow — Macintosh Quadra 700
- ShakaZulu — Sun 400M trialngle graphics
- Shame — RIAA project to distribute viruses in MP3 files
- Shark — IBM Enterprise Storage Server (ESS)
- Sharptooth — AMD K6-3 processor
- Shasta — Rocks Cluster Linux 3.2.0
- Shasta — Sun 2-way UltraSPARC IIIi
- Sheffield — Sun Netra ft 1800
- Sheffield Tesla — Sun Netra ft 1800
- Shelton — Intel Banias with no L2 cache (aka Banias-0)
- Sherlock — Apple internet information retrieval application
- Sherlock — Sun Answerbook viewable via HTML
- Sherman — Sun SPARCServer Voyager motherboard
- Sherry — Apple IIc
- Shillelagh — Source Mage GNU/Linux 0.5
- Shiloh — Microsoft SQL Server 2000 (8.0)
- Shiner HE — Apple Network Server 700
- Shiner LE — Apple Network Server 500
- Shitake — Zen Linux 1.1
- Shogun —
- Show & Tell — Macintosh LC 630
- Show & Tell — Macintosh Performa 630
- Show & Tell — Macintosh Quadra 630–638
- Show Biz — Macintosh Quadra 630–638
- Shrike — Red Hat Linux 9.0
- Siberia — ASP Linux 9.2
- Sibyl — Sun Interface Converter
- Sid — Debian GNU/Linux unstable development distribution
- Sidewinder — ATI Radeon2
- Silence — RIAA project to scan computers for MP3 files and delete them
- Silverdale — Intel processor virtualization features
- Silverstone — Turbolinux 8.W
- Sirius — Sun CPU card in Sun-3/260, 3/280
- Sirius — Yellow Dog Linux 3.0
- Sisyphus — ALT Linux
- Skipjack — Red Hat Linux 7.2.91
- Skyhawk — Sun cPCI Gigabit Ethernet MMF
- SLAVIO — Sun external serial port ASIC chip
- SledgeHammer — AMD Athlon 64 FX S940 processor
- Slice — Macintosh Color Classic
- Slink — Debian GNU/Linux 2.1
- Slipstream — Sun 1/2" HP Front Load Tape Drive
- Smithfield — Intel Pentium D dual-core processor
- Snapshot — Sun VideoPix
- Snark — DEC TOPS-20
- Snowball — Microsoft Windows for Workgroups 3.11
- Snow Leopard — Mac OS X 10.6
- Sobeck — IBM four-way processors
- Solano — Intel i815 chipset
- Solano2 — Intel i815E chipset
- Solarnet — Sun PCLAN admin utilities for PC enterprise users
- Solstizio — Linux Netwosix 1.1
- Sonata — Mac OS 9.0
- Sonoma — Intel Centrino 2nd-generation
- Sonoma — Sun StorEdge A3000
- Space Cadet — Apple A/UX 2.0
- Space Monkey — Adobe Photoshop CS2
- Space Mountain — Sun ACL 7/100
- Spam — Sun SX imaging accelerator ASIC on motherboard
- Sparkle — Sun XM-5301B
- Sparkler — Sun JDK 1.1.4
- Spartacus — 20th Anniversary Macintosh
- Speedbump 610 — Macintosh Quadra 610
- Speedbump 650 — Macintosh Quadra 650
- Speedracer — SGI Octane 2
- Speedway — Sun tools for optimized Java apps
- SPIFF — Sun Serial Parallel Controller
- Spike — Macintosh Quadra 700
- Spike — Blag Linux 9001
- Spitfire — AMD Duron
- Spitfire — Sun UltraSPARC I
- Splash Mountain — Sun StorEdge L11000
- Spock — Macintosh IIx
- Sponge — Tao Linux 4
- Sport16 — Sun SWIS, SWIS/S, DWIS, DWIS/S
- Sport20 — Sun UDWIS/S
- Sport8 — Sun SSHA
- Springdale — Intel i865PE chipset
- Spruce Goose — Macintosh PowerBook 540
- Spud — Sun 688 MB drive in expansion pedestal
- Sputnik — uOS — The Micro Operating System 0.81
- Sputnik Bluesky — Sun CP2060
- Sputnik Orion — Sun CP2080
- Spuzzum — XMAX (XMetaL for ActiveX) 4.5
- Squeaky — Macintosh II 32-bit ROMs
- Squeeze — Debian GNU/Linux 6.0
- SR-71 — Macintosh PowerBook 540
- Staccato L2 180 — HP-9000 A180c
- Staccato L2 132 — HP-9000 A132
- Star Trek — Mac OS for x86
- Starbuck — Red Hat Linux 5.9
- Starbucks — Apple Workgroup Server 6150/60, 8150/80, 9150/80
- Starburst — Sun Solaris 2.5
- Starcat — Sun SunFire 15000
- Starfire — Sun Ultra Enterprise 10000
- Starter — Aurox Linux 8.0
- Stealth — Macintosh IIfx
- Steam — Online video game distribution store and gamer network
- Stenz — Fedora Core Linux 4
- Stinger — ATI Radeon2
- Stinger — IBM DB2 8.2
- Stinger — Microsoft Windows CE 3.0 for Smart Phones (Smartphone 2002)
- Stinger — Sun 2.1 GB disk card
- Stingrack — datacenter enclosure for Sun-4/390, 4/490
- Stingray — Macintosh IIci
- Stingray — deskside enclosure for Sun-4/330
- Stingrock — Sun 4/370
- Stoned Beaver — Linux kernel 2.6.0-test10
- Stonehenge — Adobe Photoshop CS4
- StoreX — Sun open disk API architecture
- Storm — Aurox Linux 9.4
- Strange Cargo — Adobe Photoshop 5.0 and 5.5
- Stratos — Macintosh IIx
- Stretch — Debian GNU/Linux 9.0
- Suck — RIAA project to DOS sites offering MP3 files
- Sumatra — SU810
- Sumatra — Sun SPARCEngine CP1200
- Summit — Apple Workgroup Server 7250/120, 8550/132
- Summit Ridge — Ryzen 1000
- Sunbox — Sun SPARCCluster 1
- Sunchild — Trustix Secure Linux 2.2
- SunDials — Sun
- SunDragon — Sun next generation JavaStation
- Sunergy — Sun SPARCClassic X
- SunFiler — Sun E220R + 1 -2 A1000 + Solaris 7 (StorEdge N8200)
- Sunfire — Sun Ultra Enterprise 6000
- Sunfire+ — Sun Ultra Enterprise 6500
- Sunflower — Sun 20" premium color
- Sunlight — Sun FDDI board
- SunLink PC — Sun TotalNet Advanced Server software
- Sunrack — Sun 56" data center cabinet
- SunRay — Sun SPARC 4/400 series systems
- SunRay 1 — Syn Network Computer desktop system
- Sunrise — Aurox Linux 9.0
- Sunrise — Sun—4/260, 4/280
- SunScreen — Sun SPF100 hardware/software firewall
- SunSwift — Sun SBus 10/100 Mbit/s Ethernet and Fast/wide SCSI2
- Sun Valley — Windows 11 user interface
- SuperFetch — Microsoft technology in Windows Vista to speed application launch
- SuperGun —
- Super II — Apple IIe
- Superior — Sun 20" premium greyscale
- Supernami — Sun 66 MHz+ microSPARC II chip
- Susan — OpenLab GNU/Linux 3.2
- Suzuka — Turbolinux 10D
- Swift — Sun microSPARC II
- Swing — Sun Java Foundation Classes
- Sysyphus — Alt Linux 2.?
- Strations — The unbeatable warriors

== T ==
- T-Bird — Red Hat Linux 4.8
- T-Rex — IBM z990 mainframe computer
- Tabasco — Sun Redundant Storage Module
- Tactical Domestic Simulator — The Sims
- Tadpole — Sun 5 GB 4 mm
- Taj Mahal — FARA on Steroids Active Measures Analytics
- Talisker — Microsoft Windows CE 4.0
- Talon — Sun SunDials
- Tanglewood — Intel processors due 2006
- Tango — Update for Windows Phone 7.5
- Tanner — Intel Pentium 3 Xeon 250 nm processor
- Tantalus — SOT Linux 2003
- Tanzania — Power Macintosh 4400/7220
- Taroon — Red Hat Enterprise Linux 3
- Tarzan — Sun 2.1 GB Differential SCSI
- Tattle — RIAA project to scan computers and report them as pirates
- Taylor3 — Linux Multi-Disk Howto 0.32i
- Tazmax — Sun Ultra Enterprise 450 (A25)
- Tazmo — Sun Ultra 450
- Teddy — Apple IIc ("Testing Every Day")
- Tehama — Intel i850 chipset
- Tejas — Intel processors due Q2 2005 and now cancelled
- Tempest — Macintosh Quadra 660av
- Tempo — Mac OS 8
- Teragrid — Distributed Terascale Facility
- Terminator — Sun Network Terminal Server
- Tervel — Tilix Linux 0.2
- Tettnang — Fedora Core Linux 2.0
- Texas — hacking movement in a Mexican high school operated by PLhackers
- The Considerable Duck — GNOME 2.0.2 Desktop RC1
- Thor — Sun S493
- Thoroughbred — AMD Athlon XP 130 nm processor
- Thunder Mountain — Sun StorEdge L1000
- Thunderbird — AMD Athlon processor
- Thunderbird — Red Hat Linux 4.8 / 4.8.1 / 4.95
- Threshold — first two public build of Windows 10 (1507 and 1511)
- Tiger — Mac OS X 10.4
- Tiger — Sun Java 2 Standard Edition 5.0
- Tiger Eye —
- Tiger Mountain — Adobe Photoshop 3.0 for Mac
- Tillamook — Intel Mobile Pentium with MMX
- Tikanga — Red Hat Enterprise Linux 5
- Tim — Macintosh PowerBook 170
- Tim LC — Macintosh PowerBook 140
- Tim Lite — Macintosh PowerBook 140
- Timba — Seagate ST43401ND
- Timna — Intel processors
- Tiramisu — Android 13
- TNT — Power Macintosh 7500 ("The New Tesseract")
- TNT 100 — HP-9000 T500
- TNT 120 — HP-9000 T520
- Today is gonna be the day — T2 Linux 2.1.0-beta
- Toddy — Sun 14" monitor
- Tofino — XMetaL Author 4.0 Service Pack 2
- Togo — Sun SPARCStorage UniPack
- Togo Tall — Sun SPARCStorage FlexiPack
- Tonga — Sun Netra ct 400
- Topaz — Microsoft Systems Management Server
- Topcat — Sun microSPARC IIi + 256K cache module for Topdog
- Topdog — Sun Ultra AXe
- Toro — Sun Differential SCSI Expansion Pedestal
- Tornado — MSN Messenger Service
- Toucan — G400
- Trail — XMetaL 4.5 Service Pack 3 (XMetaL Author, Developer, XMAX and Central)
- Trailblazer — Power Macintosh LC 5200
- Traktopel — Mandrake Linux 8.0
- Transformer — Macintosh Performa 5200
- Transformer — Power Macintosh LC 5200
- Threshold — Windows 10
- TRex — Seagate/IBM DFHP-34320 4.2 GB 1.6" 7200 rpm disk
- Tribble — Sun SPARCClassicX Rev 2.0 software
- Trike — Blag Linux 9002
- Trinity — SiS 5597/5598
- Trinity — Power Mac G4 Cube
- Triton — Intel 430FX
- Triton/TX — Intel 430TX
- Triton/VX — Intel 430VX
- Triton2 — Intel 430HX
- Troy — AMD Opteron 200 series processors
- Tsunami — Power Macintosh 9500/120
- Tsunami — Sun microSPARC
- Tualatin — Intel Pentium III 130 nm processor
- Tukwila — Intel processors due 2006 (formerly called Tanglewood)
- Tulip — Sun 15" color monitor
- Tulloch — Intel i855 chipset
- Tulsa — Intel Xeon 7100 series
- Tumwater — Intel processors
- Tuppen — WeFlow application
- TurboGX — Sun single SBus GX card with faster 2D/3D vector
- Turion — AMD CPU name
- Twiggy — Sun X6002A thin Floppy
- Twin Castle — Intel E8500 chipset
- TwinPeaks — Sun Java interface to C/C++ library generator
- Twister — G100

== U ==
- Ucluelet — XMetaL Developer 4.0 Service Pack 2
- Ulysses — Mandrake Linux 7.2
- UltraLight 2W U+/240 — HP-9000 D390/R390
- UltraPenguin — Sun port of Linux 2.2 kernel for UltraSPARC
- Underdog — Sun PCI ATM
- Underground — WOWLinux 6.2
- Union Bay — XMetaL 4.6 (XMetaL Author, Developer and XMAX)
- Unisun — Sun Campus/SPARCstation 1
- Update 1 — Lycoris Desktop/LX Build 44
- Update 2 — Lycoris Desktop/LX Build 46
- Update 3 — Lycoris Desktop/LX Build 142
- Ural — ASP Linux 9
- Uzi — Macintosh II

== V ==
- Vail — Macintosh LC III
- Valandraud — Vine Linux 3.0
- Valhalla — Red Hat Linux 7.3
- Valkyrie — SunOS 4.1.3 (Solaris 1.1 Rev B)
- Vanadium — Windows 10 version 1909
- Vancouver — VC820
- Vanderbilt — Red Hat Linux 4.1
- Vanderpool — Intel Virtualization Technology
- Vega — Arch Linux 0.2
- Vega — Sun StarOffice 5.1
- Venice— AMD Athlon 64 90 nm processor w/ 512 KB L2 cache
- Vegas — Sun Aurora Technology 7-slot PCI Expander
- Venice — Mandrake Linux 5.1
- Venus — AMD Opteron 100 series processors
- Venus — Mandrake Linux 6.0
- Venus — Microsoft Windows CE for WebTV (see also: Microsoft Venus)
- Venus — Skolelinux 1.0
- Venus in Furs — Adobe Photoshop 6.0
- Vermeer — Ryzen 5000
- Vernon — XMAX (XMetaL for ActiveX) 4.0 Service Pack 2
- Verne — Fedora 16 Linux
- Vertex-TX — second generation vulcan elite CPU
- Vibranium — Windows 10 version 2004
- Viking — Sun SuperSPARC chip
- VineSeed — Vine Linux current testing
- Viper — AMD-756
- Viper — Turbolinux 8.0S Beta
- Viper+ — AMD-766
- Viper — Ross Technology 64-bit SPARC processor
- Viros — DEC TOPS-20
- Virtue — Source Mage GNU/Linux 0.9.3
- Visa — Sun SPARCEngine CP2000
- Vishera — AMD's Update to Bullzoder Released Oct 2012 Bulldozer (microarchitecture))
- Vitamin — Mandrake Linux 8.1
- VLC — (Very Low Cost) Apple IIc
- VLX — Tandem NonStop 4th Generation (Later HP NonStop)
- Vostok — ASP Linux 7.3
- Voyager — Sun SuperSPARC II
- Vulcan — Seagate ST31200N

== W ==
- Waghor — LinuxTLE 7.0
- Walkaround — Google Wave
- Wall Street — Macintosh PowerBook G3
- Wallop — Microsoft project that includes blogging, filesharing, etc.
- Wally — Sun StorEdge D240
- Walrus — Sun Ultra 10 with 333 MHz
- Warm Springs — Intel WS440BX
- Warty Warthog — Ubuntu 4.10
- Water — Aurox Linux 9.2
- Watney — Sun SunForum 3.2
- Wave3 — Sun Solaris 2.6
- Weed-Whacker — Macintosh IIfx
- Werewolf — Fedora 8
- Wheezey — Debian GNU/Linux 7.0
- Whidbey — Microsoft Visual Studio 2005
- Whistler — Microsoft Windows XP
- Whistler — XMetaL Author 4.0 Service Pack 1 Localized (French and German)
- Whistler Server — Microsoft Windows Server 2003
- Whitefield — Intel Xeon processors due in 2006, cancelled
- White Rabbit — Adobe Photoshop CS5
- Whitney — Intel i810 chipset
- Whopper — Seagate ST11200N
- Wide Stinger — Sun 4.2 GB, 8.4 GB disk card
- Widget — Arch Linux 0.6
- Wilbur — HP-9000 E35
- Willamette — Intel Pentium 4 180 nm processor
- Wildcat — Sun high speed bus interconnect
- Wildfire — Sun parallel UltraSPARC
- Wildlife — ROCK Linux 2.0.2
- Wiley — Sun StorEdge S1
- Winchester — first floating-head disk drive, IBM, 1973
- Winchester — AMD Athlon 64 90 nm processor
- Wind — Aurox Linux 9.3
- Windermere —
- Windsor — AMD Athlon 64 X2/FX 90 nm processor (Socket AM2 w/ DDR2-800)
- Wolfack — Windows NT"Cluster Server"
- Wolfdale — code name for a processor from Intel
- Wolverine — Red Hat Linux 7.0.91
- Wombat — Arch Linux 0.7-beta1
- Wombat 33 — Macintosh Quadra 800
- Wonderboy — Trustix Secure Linux 2.2-beta1
- Woodcrest — Intel Xeon 5100 series processors
- Woody — Debian GNU/Linux 3.0
- Wren4 — Seagate 4.2 GB 1.6" 5400 rpm disk
- Wyoming — Sun full 64-bit version of Solaris
- Wyvern — Microsoft Windows CE 2.11, Palm-sized PC 1.2

== X ==
- Xbox — Sun SBus Expansion Subsystem
- Xena — Sun 21" monitor
- Xenon — Microsoft Xbox 360 (successor to the Microsoft Xbox)
- XO — Macintosh Classic

== Y ==
- Yaeger — Macintosh PowerBook Duo 280c
- Yamazaki — Windows Embedded CE 6.0
- Yamhill — Intel processors
- Yami — Chinese Linux Extension 0.9
- Yarrow — Fedora Core Linux 1.0
- Yarrow — Ignalum Linux 9
- Yellow Box — Apple Rhapsody development platform
- Yoda — Apple IIc
- Yonah — Intel Core Duo processor
- Yosemite — Power Mac G3
- Yosemite — OS X 10.10
- Yorkfield — code name for some Intel processors sold as Core 2 Quad
- Yosemite — Sun Developer Products SPARCCompilers
- Yukon — Microsoft SQL Server 2005

== Z ==
- Zambezi — Name of AMD processor's Core
- Zappa —
- Zebra — Sun SPARCPrinter
- Zelda — Apple IIc
- Zephyr — Sun 64-bit compilers
- Zeus — Sun developer's release of SunOS based on SVR4
- Zippy — SunVideo Plus PCI
- Zircon — Seagate ST31200WC
- Zircon II — Seagate CFP1060E
- Zeotrope — AlphaCrhome
- Zod — Fedora Core 6 Linux
- Zoltrix — Computer Electronics Brand
- Zone 5 — Macintosh IIfx
- Zoot — Red Hat Linux 6.2
- Zulu — Sun 200M triangle graphics
- ZX — Sun Leo 24-bit color frame buffer
- Zydeco — Macintosh Quadra 950

== See also ==
- List of Microsoft software codenames
- List of Intel codenames
- List of Apple codenames
