= SPARCstation ZX =

1993 Sun Microsystems workstation

- Codename: Sunergy (Note: The SPARCstation LX shares the code-name Sunergy with the SPARCclassic, SPARCclassic X, and SPARCstation LX.)
- Also known as: 4/30
- Developer: Sun Microsystems
- Manufacturer: Sun Microsystems
- Product family: SPARCstation
- Type: Graphical workstation
- Released: July 5, 1993
- Availability: July 5, 1993
- Introductory price: US$19,995
- Operating system: SunOS; Solaris
- CPU: microSPARC at 50 MHz
- Memory: 16–128 MB
- Related: SPARCstation LX

The SPARCstation ZX is a graphical workstation produced by Sun Microsystems and launched on July 5, 1993, as part of the SPARCstation family. The original price was US$19,995 (equivalent to $44,564 in 2025)

The SPARCstation ZX was identical to the SPARCstation LX, with the addition of a Sun ZX (also known as LEO) accelerated 3D framebuffer card. This was a double-width, double-decked SBus card providing 24-bit color and a performance of 440,000 3D vectors per second and 275,000 triangle mesh/second, when coupled with the SPARCstation ZX. It was intended to compete chiefly with Silicon Graphics and their Indigo workstation, with Sun claiming that the SPARCstation ZX outperformed the latter's Indigo XS/24 in terms of triangle mesh/second (275,000 versus 50,000).
