= SPARCstation LX =

Workstation computer

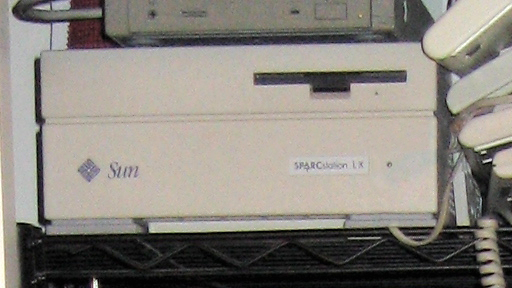
- Codename: Sunergy (Note: The SPARCstation LX shares the codename Sunergy with the low-end range of SPARCclassic, SPARCclassic X, and SPARCstation ZX.)
- Also known as: 4/30
- Developer: Sun Microsystems
- Manufacturer: Sun Microsystems
- Product family: SPARCstation
- Type: Workstation
- Released: November 10, 1992
- Availability: December 1992
- Introductory price: US$7,995
- Operating system: SunOS; Solaris
- CPU: microSPARC at 50 MHz
- Memory: 16 MB to 96 MB (officially); up to 128 MB (unofficially)
- Graphics: Onboard CG6 (GXplus)
- Sound: 16-bit audio
- Connectivity: Ethernet (10BASE-T, AUI)
- Power: 70W
- Dimensions: 9.6 in (24 cm) (W) × 10.4 in (26 cm) (D) × 4.6 in (12 cm) (H)
- Weight: 11.5 lb (5.2 kg)
- Predecessor: SPARCstation IPX
- Successor: SPARCstation 4
- Related: SPARCclassic; SPARCstation ZX

The SPARCstation LX (Sun model number 4/30) is a workstation that was designed, manufactured, and sold by Sun Microsystems. It was introduced on November 10, 1992, with an initial list price of $7,995 (equivalent to about $18,000 in 2025). Volume shipments commenced in December 1992 from Sun's factory in Chelmsford, Massachusetts.

Though cheaper than mainstream models in Sun's SPARCstation range at the time, such as the SPARCstation 2, both the SPARCstation LX and the SPARCclassic sold relatively slowly; Sun shipped approximately 3,500 units combined of these two models in late 1992.

The SPARCstation LX shares the codename "Sunergy" with the SPARCclassic, SPARCclassic X, and SPARCstation ZX.

== Software ==
The SPARCstation LX supports several operating systems. It originally shipped with Solaris 2.1 (SunOS 5.1). It requires SunOS version 4.1.3 Revision C or later, or Solaris 2.3 (SunOS 5.3) or later. Compatibility with Solaris extends up to Solaris 9 (SunOS 5.9). Sun discontinued support for the sun4m architecture, which includes the SPARCstation LX, after Solaris 9.

NetBSD/sparc32 supports sun4m machines, including the SPARCstation LX and its cgsix framebuffer. OpenBSD/sparc32 supported it up to version 5.9. Various Linux distributions can run on the SPARCstation LX.

== Hardware ==
The SPARCstation LX is based on the sun4m architecture and is housed in Sun's "lunchbox" style chassis. It has a single 50 MHz MicroSPARC processor, which integrates the CPU, FPU, MMU, and cache.

The motherboard features three memory banks, each containing two DSIMM slots, for a total of six slots. Main memory configurations include 16 MB, 32 MB, 64 MB, or 96 MB, installed in pairs of 4 MB or 16 MB 60ns 72-pin DSIMMs. Sun documentation consistently states 96 MB as the maximum official memory capacity. The first bank can unofficially accommodate 32 MB SIMMs, potentially allowing a total of 128 MB. A typical configuration shipped with 16 MB of RAM.

For graphics, the motherboard has an accelerated CG6 framebuffer, also referred to as TurboGX or GXplus. It includes 1 MB of VRAM standard, which is expandable to 2 MB via a dedicated VSIMM slot. The CG6 has improved performance over the CG3 framebuffer in the SPARCclassic. With the VRAM expansion, the CG6 can support resolutions up to 1600 × 1280.

Internal storage consists of a 3.5-inch SCSI hard disk drive; the Sun System Configuration Guide lists options from 207 MB to 1.05 GB. A 1.44 MB 3.5-inch floppy disk drive is also standard. The system supports additional external SCSI-2 devices. There is no IDE/ATAPI support.

The 16-bit audio capabilities are an upgrade from the SPARCclassic's 8-bit audio. It has audio input and output jacks, and it originally shipped with a condenser microphone. The audio system is based on the DBRI chip, which also provides ISDN capabilities via a port on the motherboard. The system includes two SBus expansion slots.

Networking is provided by an onboard Ethernet controller, supporting both 10BASE-T (Twisted Pair Ethernet) and AUI connections. Standard I/O ports include two serial ports (DB25), one parallel port (DB25), and a keyboard/mouse port (mini DIN-8).

The OpenBoot ROM stores system parameters, including the Ethernet (MAC address), host ID, and real-time clock, in a NVRAM chip which also contains an integrated battery. If this battery fails, critical system information is lost, and the system may be unable to boot automatically. In such events, boot parameters typically need to be entered manually via the OpenBoot command line interface.

The physical dimensions of the "lunchbox" case are approximately 9.6 in (24 cm) in width, 10.4 in (26 cm) in depth, and 4.6 in (12 cm) in height, with a weight of around 11.5 lb (5.2 kg). The power supply is rated at 70W.

The SPARCstation ZX is described as a SPARCstation LX with Sun's ZX "Leo" 24-bit color SBus framebuffer card instead of the onboard CG6.

== Reception ==
The January 1993 issue of SunExpert Magazine extolled the "eye-popping SPARCstation LX", highlighting its impressive 59 MIPS performance, accelerated graphics, and built-in ISDN. The magazine positioned the workstation for demanding applications such as CAD, AEC (Architecture, Engineering, and Construction), CASE, design automation, document processing, imaging, and office automation.

In its March 1993 review, Byte Magazine described the SPARCstation LX as "short and sweet", positioned as a general-purpose desktop machine and a low-cost file server. The review highlighted its 50 MHz MicroSPARC processor, noting its integer performance as "good" and its floating-point performance as "very good" for its class, outperforming a SPARCstation 2 in these areas. Disk I/O was also rated as "very good". The integrated GXplus graphics (CG6) were considered a significant feature, providing good X Window System performance. It noted that Sun faced increasing competition from other RISC vendors and the upcoming Intel Pentium processor, but found the SPARCstation LX to be a competitive offering at $7,995 (equivalent to about $18,000 in 2025) for a system that included Solaris 2.1, 16 MB RAM, and a 424 MB hard drive.

Later, in the context of its successor's launch, a UPI report from March 29, 1994, noted that Sun Microsystems claimed the new SPARCstation 5 ran twice as fast as the SPARCstation LX, and at a lower price.
