= DTK =

DTK may refer to:

== Businesses and organisations ==
- Democratic Society Congress (Demokratik Toplum Kongresi), a pro-Kurdish NGO in Turkey
- Deutsche Bank Contingent Capital Trust III, listed as DTK on the New York Stock Exchange
- Diamond Trust Bank Group, traded as DTK on the Nairobi Securities Exchange
- DTK Computer, a defunct Taiwanese computer hardware company

== Computing ==
- Developer Transition Kit, Apple's first ARM-based Macintosh computer for developers
- Dell OpenManage Deployment Toolkit

== Places ==
- Downtown Kilgore, Texas, United States
- Duttapukur railway station, West Bengal, India

== Other uses ==
- Dunia Tanpa Koma, a 2006 Indonesian television series
- Tomo Kan, a Dogon dialect spoken in Burkina Faso
