= SS5 =

SS5 may refer to:

- SS-5 Skean, a Soviet theatre ballistic missile
- Signaling System No. 5, a multi-frequency telephone signalling system
- SPARCstation 5, a workstation produced by Sun Microsystems
- USS Moccasin (SS-5), a submarine of the United States Navy
- Form SS-5 of the Social Security Administration of the federal government of the United States, "Application for a Social Security Number Card"
