= SPARCclassic =

Sun Microsystems workstation model

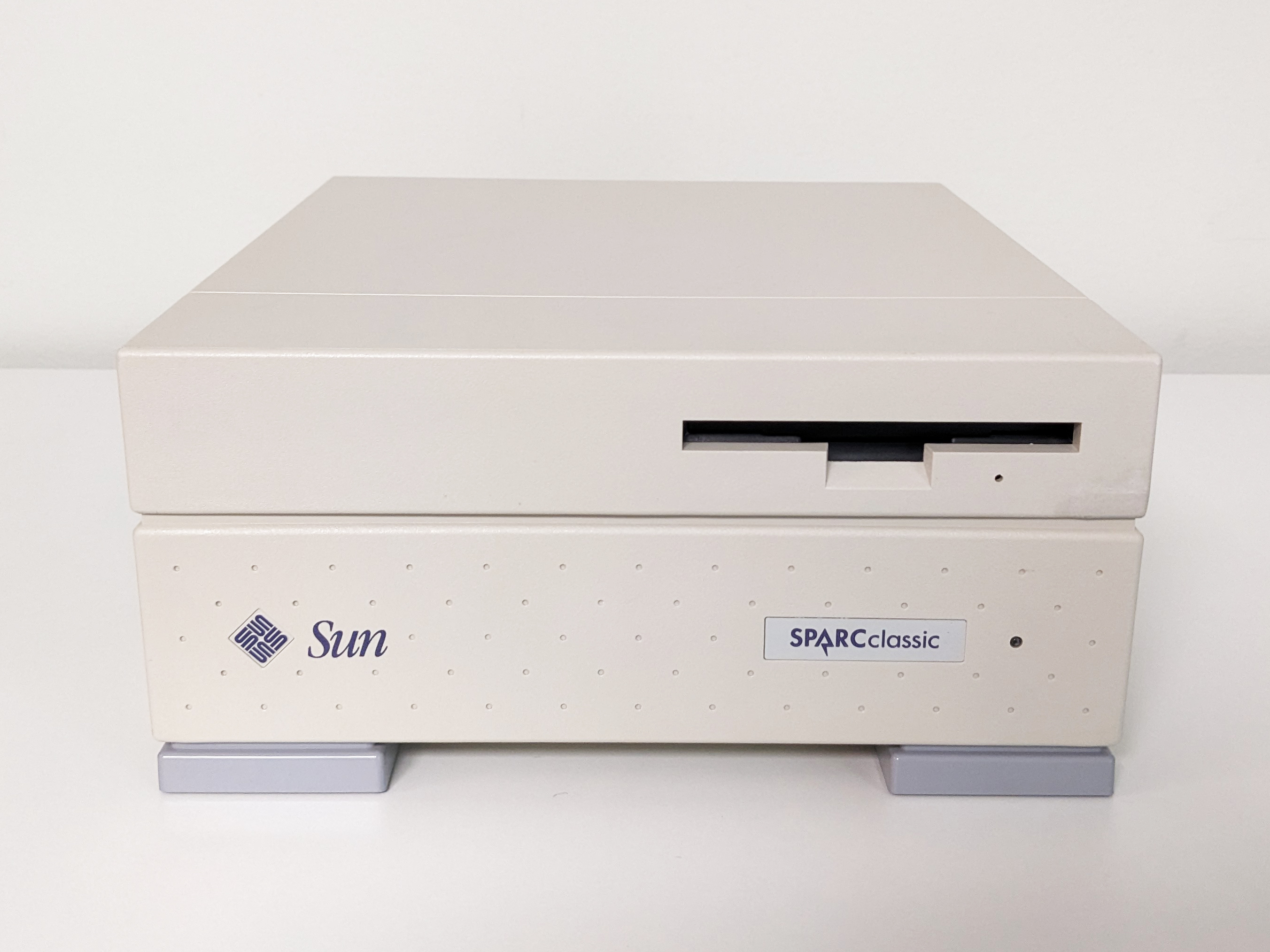
- Codename: Sunergy (Note: The SPARCstation LX shares the code-name Sunergy with the low-end range of SPARCclassic, SPARCclassic X, and SPARCstation ZX.)
- Also known as: 4/15
- Developer: Sun Microsystems
- Manufacturer: Sun Microsystems
- Product family: SPARCstation
- Type: Workstation
- Released: November 10, 1992
- Availability: December 1992
- Introductory price: US$4,495
- Operating system: SunOS; Solaris
- CPU: microSPARC at 50 MHz
- Memory: 16–128 MB (96 MB officially)
- Successor: SPARCstation 4
- Related: SPARCstation LX

The SPARCclassic (Sun 4/15) is a workstation introduced by Sun Microsystems. It is based on the sun4m architecture, and is enclosed in a lunchbox chassis. It was unveiled on November 10, 1992, along with the SPARCstation LX; both were marketed at the low end of the Unix workstation market. The SPARCclassic had an original retail price of US$4,495 (equivalent to $10,313 in 2025).

== Specifications ==
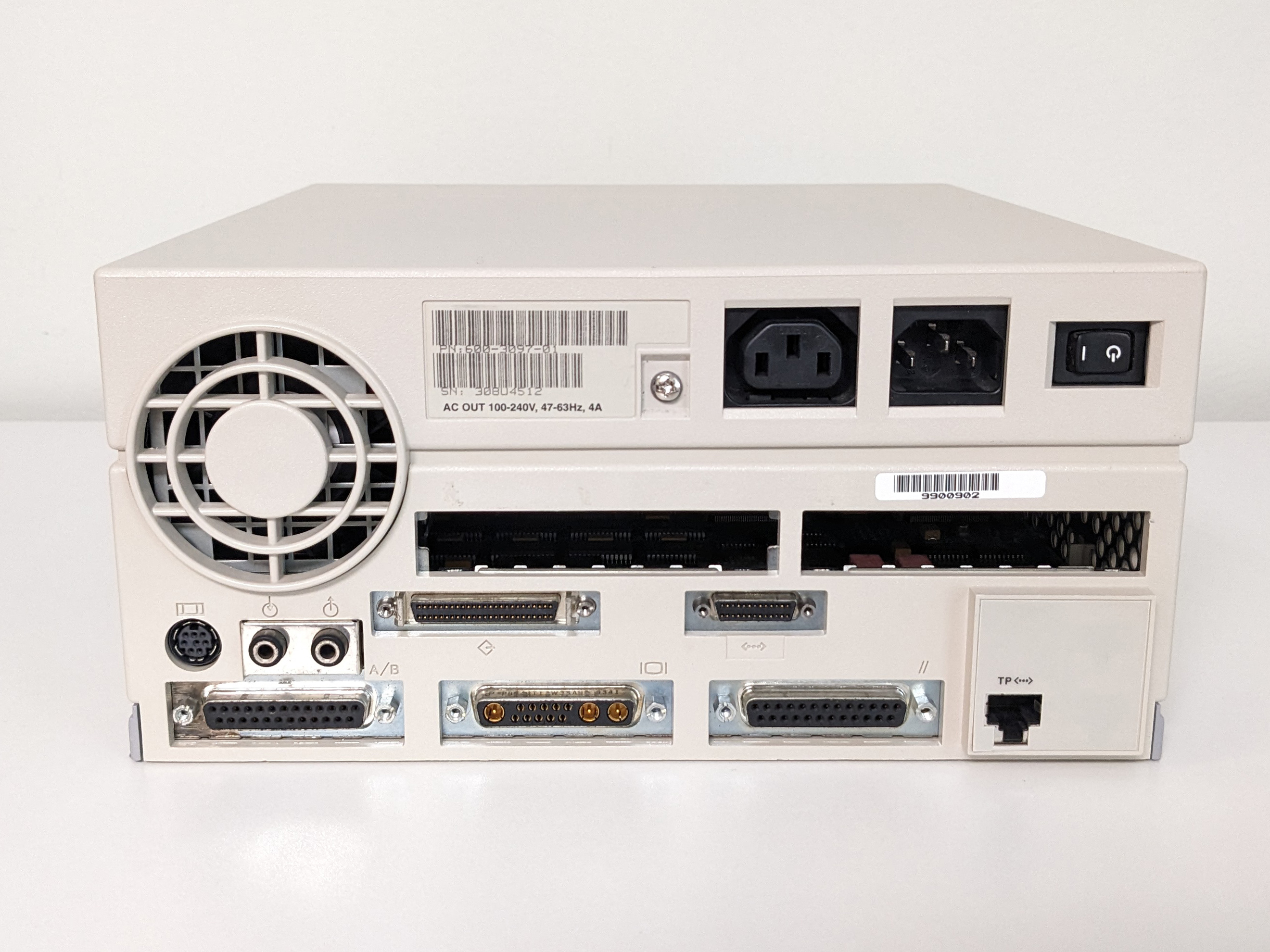
Rear view of the SPARCclassic

=== CPU support ===
The SPARCclassic incorporates a single 50 MHz microSPARC processor.

=== Memory ===
The SPARCclassic has three banks with two DSIMM slots each. The official maximum configuration uses 16 MB modules for a total of 96 MB, but the first bank can also hold 32 MB modules giving a maximum of 128 MB memory.

=== Disk drives ===
The SPARCclassic can hold one internal 3.5-inch 50-pin, single ended, fast-narrow SCSI drive and a floppy. It also supports external SCSI devices. There is no IDE/ATAPI support.

=== Network support ===
The SPARCclassic comes with an on-board AMD Lance Ethernet chipset providing 10BASE-T networking as standard and 10BASE2 and 10BASE5 via an AUI transceiver. The OpenBoot ROM is able to boot from network, using RARP and TFTP. Like all other SPARCstation systems, the SPARCclassic holds system information such as MAC address and serial number in NVRAM. If the battery on this chip dies, then the system will not be able to boot.

=== Dimensions ===
Its dimensions are 9.6 in (24 cm) × 10.4 in (26 cm) × 4.6 in (12 cm) (W × D × H). The weight is 11 lb (5.0 kg).

== Operating systems ==
The following operating systems run on a SPARCclassic:

- SunOS 4.1.3c onwards
- Solaris 2.3 Edition II to Solaris 9
- Linux - Some but not all distributions still support this sparc32 sub-architecture
- NetBSD/sparc32
- OpenBSD/sparc32

== Differences between Classic and LX ==
The SPARCclassic was designed to be an entry-level workstation with a lower price point than the SPARCstation LX; it has a lower-end CG3 framebuffer rather than the LX's accelerated CG6. The SPARCclassic also features 8-bit audio as opposed to 16-bit audio for the LX. The motherboards of the two systems are otherwise similar, and both use the same chassis.

== SPARCclassic X ==
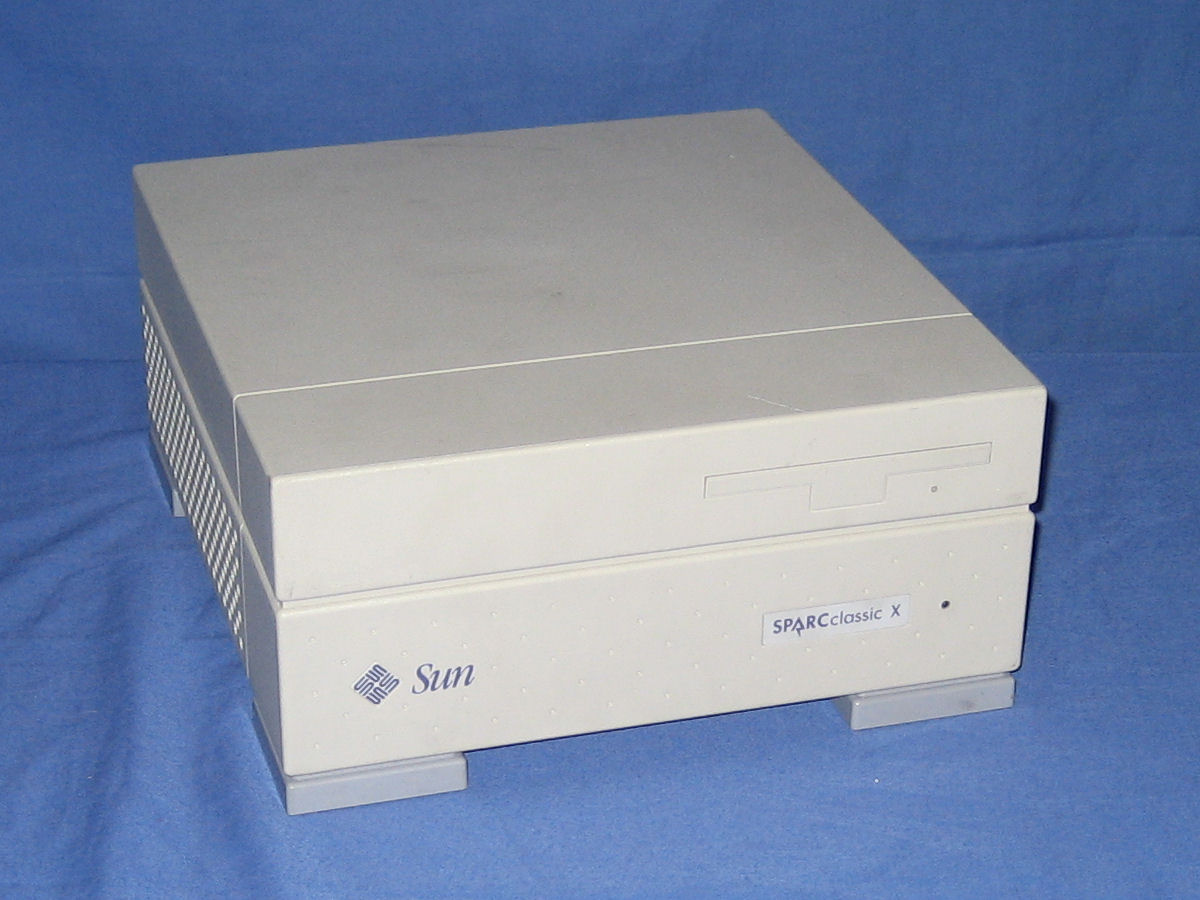
SPARCclassic X, an X terminal based on the SPARCclassic workstation

In July 1993, Sun introduced the SPARCclassic X, a stripped-down SPARCclassic marketed as an X terminal. It shipped with no local storage, and either 4 or 8 MB of memory.

Rather than running Solaris, the SPARCclassic X loaded and ran special software over the network.

Sun offered an upgrade kit to a full workstation that included a hard drive and additional memory.
