= DTK Computer =

Taiwanese computer company

Datatech Enterprises Co., Ltd.
- Trade name: DTK Computer
- Type: Private
- Industry: Computers
- Founded: 1981; 45 years ago in Taipei, Taiwan; 1986 in Rosemead, California, United States
- Defunct: 2009; 17 years ago
- Fate: Dissolved (except Dubai branch)
- Revenue: US$99 million (1994)
- Number of employees: 1,000 (1989)

DTK Computer is the name for international branches of Datatech Enterprises Co., Ltd., a Taiwanese computer manufacturer. Founded in 1981, the company was an early supplier of peripherals for IBM PCs as well as PC compatible motherboards. In the late 1980s, the company switched to developing complete systems under the DTK name as well as serving as an OEM for motherboards and cases, as bought by other small computer companies and systems integrators.

DTK was little-known in its own time but performed well in the marketplace. By 1991, the company was the second-largest computer system manufacturer in Taiwan, behind Acer. It was the 10th and 11th biggest personal computer manufacturer in the world in 1991 and 1992 respectively, according to Electronics magazine.

== History ==
=== Foundation and expansion (1981–1989) ===
Datatech Enterprises was established in Taipei, Taiwan, in 1981. The company was founded by eight employees with US$15,000 in start-up capital; in 1982, Datatech raised an additional US$337,000 in capital and expanded to 24 employees. Datatech's president Duke Liao founded the company's United States branch in 1986. This branch was named DTK Computer and was initially headquartered in Rosemead, California. In 1989, DTK moved their headquarters to the City of Industry in California to afford more space for its warehouse of products and to lessen the driving distance for most of its employee base, which in 1993 comprised 100 employees.

Datatech employed 1,000 people globally in 1989. Its research and development lab in Taiwan grew from 45 employees to 72 that year. The workplace environment in Taiwan was relatively progressive for the time: only a single layer of management existed between engineers and the company presidents; management allowed capable engineers to fully experiment in their departments; and while employees worked from eight to ten hours on weekdays and four hours on Saturdays, they had flexible hours, with a two-hour grace period for employees' nominal starting times and no punch clock. The R&D lab was cramped for space, however, with workbenches and two-by-four-foot desks arranged in a loose grid, bookshelves being used for equipment storage and small tables being used to store books and papers. (Note: Datatech planned to move the lab to a larger location in Taiwan in late 1989 (Legg 1989, p. 57).)

The company manufactured clones for several architectures, including the IBM PC standards, Micro Channel, and SPARC. The R&D lab's Systems Development department, managed by Norman Tsai in 1989, was responsible for creating and maintaining the different divisions for each architecture and hiring employees for those divisions. Most employees in Systems Development had majored in electrical engineering with emphasis in computer architecture while in college. The Institute for Information Industry funded research for DTK, as they had done with other computer companies in Taiwan.

Datatech developed its own chipsets in addition to purchasing ones from VLSI and Chips and Technologies. The company's ASIC division comprised 20 employees under the supervision of Dr. Chen Kunnan in 1989. Most employees in this division were trained on the job, although some were also taught at seminars hosted by other ASIC manufacturers. The Electronics Research Service Organization, an agency of the Taiwanese government focused on VLSI circuits, provided funding for this division. Engineers designed the company's chipsets with the use of several EDA tools, including an ECAD Dracula design-rule checker, an ASIX II VLSI checker, a Daisy Logician circuit simulator, a MicroVAX II, and several EGA workstations. Up to four employees shared each workstation. Owing to the company's streamlined nature, new equipment could be delivered in two weeks, compared to two months for Acer, Datatech's domestic competitor.

Unusual for a company of its stature, Datatech also developed its own BIOS for its IBM PC compatibles. Its first PC BIOS clone was developed in 1985; while second source of such BIOSes had already been developed by companies such as Phoenix Technologies in the United States, Datatech feared that they would be sued out of existence by IBM and so developed its own clean-room implementations in 1985. Although Datatech's fears were later assuaged, quality-assurance supervisor David Wang felt that the continued development of in-house BIOSes afforded the company technical expertise that could be applied to other aspects of their R&D lab, as was the case for the company's ASIC division.

=== Further expansion (1989–1999) ===
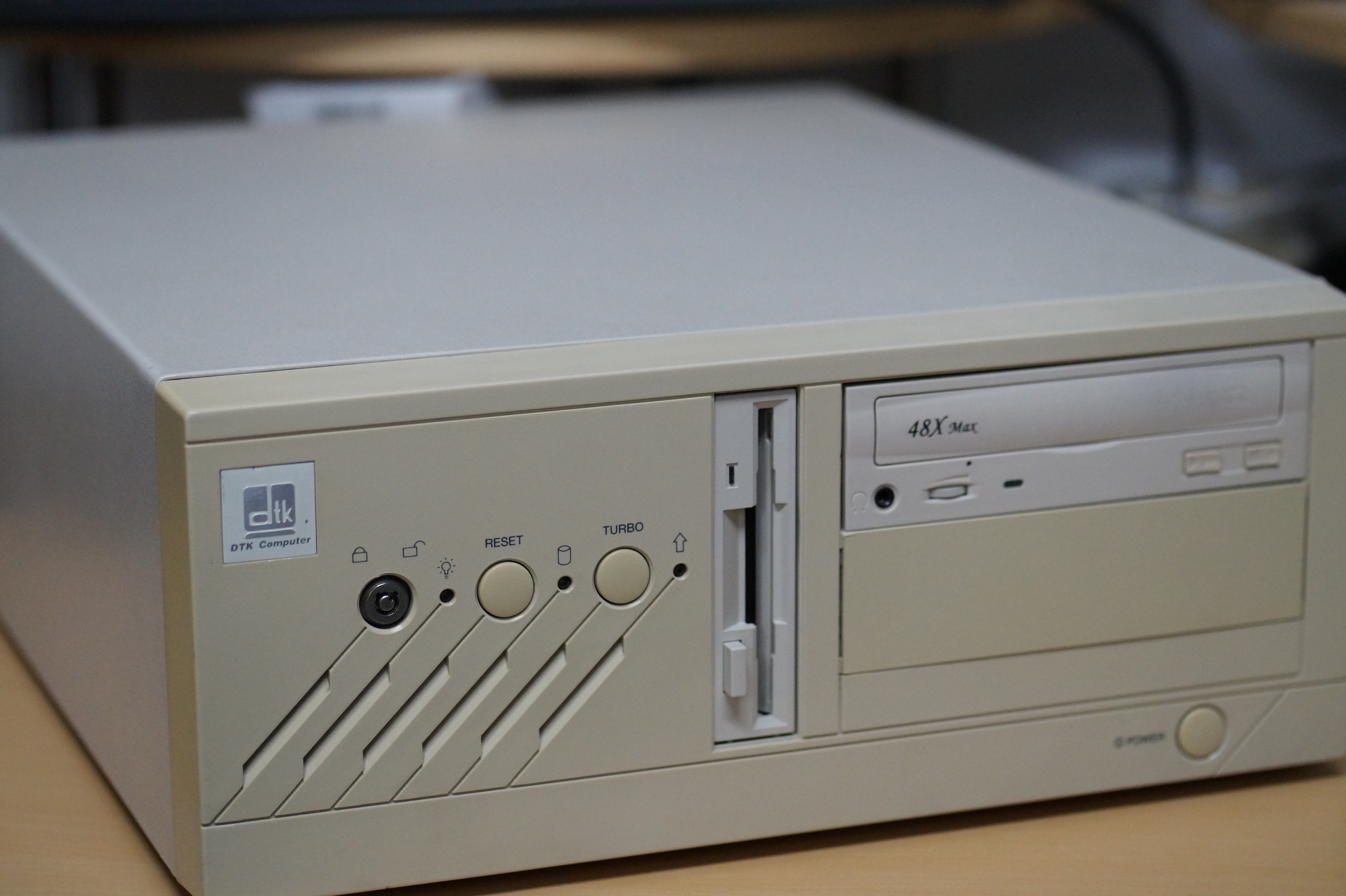
A DTK Computer system c. 1993

In the United States, DTK Computer expanded to Texas in 1988, leasing a 17,700-square-foot office in the Alief section of Houston. It later opened up production facilities in Elk Grove Village, Illinois; Norcross, Georgia; Miami, Florida; and New Jersey. DTK began manufacturing computers within the United States in Norcross in the early 1990s, leasing a 150,000-square-foot assembly plant near Georgia State Route 141. Computers manufactured there were shipped domestically and abroad, including to Hong Kong. DTK's Miami facility, meanwhile, was particularly conducive to DTK's sales in Latin America.

DTK was among the first companies to have its computers sold via satellite television in 1991. Satellite Market USA, a satellite-only shopping channel, premiered the Satellite Computer Store in 1991, a program on which DTK and several other computer brands were advertised. In 1992, the company also set up two brick-and-mortar computer stores. These stores did not sell to the end users directly but instead targeted resellers, putting their Grafika multimedia PCs on display as well as accompanying promotional material. A Kansas store was opened in January; another was set up in the Metro Center of Nashville in November. DTK posted revenues of $99 million in the United States in 1994, selling 46,000 equipment units that year.

Duke Liao founded Datatech's Hong Kong subsidiary in 1990, naming it Gemlight Computer. Elsewhere in Asia, Datatech expanded into Japan, India, and Mainland China in Shenzhen. In 1996, its Dubai subsidiary, DTK Computer FZE, was founded. Japan was the primary market for Datatech's SPARC workstations. Datatech's Taiwanese operation changed its name to Advance Creative Computer in the mid-1990s and began focusing on PowerPC- and UltraSPARC-based machines as well as Java-based internet appliances. Advance Creative abandoned its PowerPC pursuits in 1996, citing Apple's disposition toward open architectures, but continued developing Java appliances and UltraSPARC workstations. In Europe, meanwhile, DTK established subsidiaries in Germany, Austria, Poland, Hungary, and Moscow.

=== Decline (1999–2009) ===
Gemlight of Hong Kong dissolved sometime in 2001. DTK Computer's offices ceased operations in 2002, filing a certificate of dissolution to the Secretary of State in 2005. DTK's Taiwanese website went down in 2009.

As of January 2025, DTK Computer FZE is still operational.

== Products ==
Explanatory notes

- Superserver denotes a server with swappable drive bays.
- Grafika computers, as opposed to their bare-bone counterparts, were fully configured with MS-DOS 5.0 and Windows 3.0 and came shipped with a keyboard and a mouse.

=== Personal computers ===
DTK personal computers
Model	Processor	Clock speed (MHz)	L2 cache (KB)	Form factor	Date introduced	Ref(s).
DATA-1000	Intel 8088	10	0	Desktop	1987	
TECH-1230	Intel 80286	12	0	Mini-desktop	1989	
TECH-1263	Intel 80286	12	0	Slimline	1990	
TECH-1632	Intel 80286	16	0	Mini-desktop	1990	
KEEN-2000D	Intel 80386	20	0	Desktop	November 1988	
KEEN-2000T	Intel 80386	20	0	Tower	November 1988	
KEEN-2032	Intel 80386	20	0	Mini-desktop	1989	
KEEN-2500	Intel 80386	25	0	Desktop	September 1989	
KEEN-2503	Intel 80386	25	0	Server	September 1989	
KEEN-2530	Intel 80386	25	0	Mini-desktop	1990	
KEEN-2531	Intel 80386	25		Desktop	January 1991	
KEEN-2561	Intel 80386	25		Mini-desktop	1992	(Note: Virtually the same as the KEEN-2531 in specification except the KEEN-2531 has eight expansion slots (one 32-bit, five 16-bit, and one 8-bit), while the KEEN-2561 has five 16-bit slots)
KEEN-3302	Intel 80386	33	64–256	Desktop	1990	
KEEN-3304	Intel 80386	33	64–256	Server	1990	
KEEN-3332	Intel 80386	33	64–256	Tower	January 1991	
KEEN-3335	Intel 80386	33	64–256	Tower	1992	
KEEN-3336	Intel 80386	33	64–256	Desktop	1992	
KEEN-4030	Intel 80386	40	64–256	Desktop	1992	
KEEN-4035	Intel 80386	40	64–256	Tower	1992	
KEEN-3362	Intel 80386	33	64–256	Desktop	1992	
PEER-1630	Intel 80386SX	16	0	Mini-desktop	1990	
PEER-1632	Intel 80386SX	16	0	Desktop	1990	
PEER-1660	Intel 80386SX	16	0	Slimline	1990	
PEER-2030	Intel 80386SX	20	0	Mini-desktop	1990	
FEAT-2500	Intel 80486	25	64–256	Desktop	January 1990	
FEAT-2502	Intel 80486	25	64–256	Server	January 1990	
FEAT-2503	Intel 80486	25	64–256	Superserver	January 1990	
FEAT-3300	Intel 80486	33	64–256	Tower	January 1990	
FEAT-03	Intel 80486	33		Tower or desktop	June 1993	(Note: Equipped with two VESA Local Bus slots)
FEAT-38	Intel 80486DX2	66	128	Mini-tower	1994	
FEAT-35	Intel 80486DX2	66	256	Mini-tower	1994	
FEAT-39M	Intel 80486DX4	100		Mini-tower	1995	
FEAT-62	Intel 80486DX2	66	128–256	Slimline	1994	
SPAN-3300	Intel 80486	33		Desktop	1990	(Note: Extended Industry Standard Architecture motherboard)
Grafika 2A	Intel 80286	16	0	Desktop	December 1991	
Grafika 3A	Intel 80386SX	20	0	Desktop	December 1991	
Grafika 3B	Intel 80386	25	0	Desktop	December 1991	
Grafika 3C	Intel 80386	33	0	Desktop	December 1991	
Grafika 3D	Intel 80386	33	0	Tower	December 1991	
Grafika 3E	Am386	40	0	Tower	December 1991	
Grafika 4A	Intel 80486	33	64–256	Desktop	December 1991	
Grafika 4B	Intel 80486	33	64–256	Tower	December 1991	
Grafika 4I	Intel 80486	66		Mini-tower	November 1992	
Grafika 4J	Intel 80486	66		Mini-desktop	November 1992	
Grafika 4VI	Intel 80486	33			June 1993	
Grafika 42VD-S2	Intel 80486SX	25		Desktop	1993	
QUIN-32	Pentium	60	256–512	Tower	1994	
QUIN-O2/33	Pentium	60 or 66	256–512	Mid-tower or mini-desktop	1995	
QUIN-34	Pentium	60 or 66	256–1024	Mid-tower or mini-desktop	1995	
QUIN-35	Pentium	75, 90, or 100	256–1024	Mid-tower or mini-desktop	1995	
QUIN-51	Pentium	75, 90, or 100	256	Mid-tower or mini-desktop	1995	
QUIN-52	Pentium	75, 90, or 100	256–512	Mid-tower or mini-desktop	1995	
QUIN-54	Pentium	75, 90, 100, 120, or 133		Mid-tower or mini-desktop	1995	
QUIN-55	Pentium	100, 120, 133, 150, 166, or 200	512	Mid-tower	1995	
QUIN-61	Pentium	75, 90, 100, 120 or 133		Slimline	1995	
APRI-31	Pentium Pro	180 or 200		Tower	1996	
APRI-32	Pentium Pro (dual)	200		Tower	1996	
APRI-74M	Pentium II	233, 266, or 300	512	Tower	1997	
APRI-76M	Pentium II	233, 266, 300, or 333	512	Tower	1997	
APRI-77M	Pentium II (dual)	333		Tower	1998	
APRI-80M	Pentium II	400		Tower	1998	
APRI-80M/PIII	Pentium III	500, 600		Tower	1999	
APRI-81S	Pentium II (dual)	450		Tower	1999	

=== Laptops ===
DTK laptops
Model	Processor	Clock speed (MHz)	RAM (MB)	LCD technology	Date introduced	Ref(s).
DNB/1	Intel 80386SX	16	1–5	Passive-matrix monochrome	August 1991	
DSN-3340C	Intel 80486SX	33	4	Passive-matrix color	August 1993	
DSN-3340	Intel 80486SX	33	4	Passive-matrix monochrome	August 1993	
DTN-5P60A	Intel Pentium	60	8–40	Passive-matrix color or monochrome	June 1994	
DTN-4T66P	Intel 80486DX2	66	4–52	Passive-matrix color	June 1994	
DTN-4T66M	Intel 80486DX2	66	4–52	Passive-matrix monochrome	June 1994	
DTN-4T100P	Intel 80486DX4	100	8–40	Passive-matrix color	April 1995	
DTN-5P90	Intel Pentium	90	16–40	Passive-matrix color	November 1995	
DTM-5A120C	Intel Pentium	120	2–?	Active-matrix color	1996	
FortisPro Top5A233	Pentium MMX	233	32–144	Active-matrix color	1998	

=== Workstations and servers ===
DTK workstations
Model	Processor	Clock speed (MHz)	Form factor	Date introduced	Ref(s).
Station M30	MicroSPARC	30	Tower	June 1993	
Station M41	MicroSPARC	40	Tower	June 1993	
Station Classic+	MicroSPARC	50	Tower	June 1993	
Cosmos II NT Server	Pentium II Xeon (dual)	450	Tower	1998	
Vista II NT Server	Pentium II Xeon (quad)	400	Tower	1998	
Grafika 550 NT Workstation	Pentium III	733	Tower	1998	
