= MicroSPARC =

Discontinued microprocessor

microSPARC
General information
- Launched: 1992
- Discontinued: 1994
- Designed by: Sun Microsystems

Performance
- Max. CPU clock rate: 40 MHz to 125 MHz

Physical specifications
- Cores: 1

Architecture and classification
- Instruction set: SPARC V8

The microSPARC (code-named Tsunami) is a discontinued microprocessor implementing the SPARC V8 instruction set architecture (ISA), developed by Sun Microsystems. It is a low-end microprocessor intended for low-end workstations and embedded systems. The microprocessor was developed by Sun, but the floating-point unit (FPU) was licensed from Meiko Scientific. It contains 800,000 transistors. It was used in the SPARCclassic and SPARCstation LX among others.

There are two variants of the microSPARC-II (code-named Swift): the microSPARC-II and microSPARC-IIep. The microSPARC-II is used in the SPARCstation 5. The microSPARC-IIep is a 100 MHz microSPARC-II with an integrated PCI controller for embedded systems. It was developed and fabricated by LSI Logic for Sun, and used in their JavaStation Network Computer.

Name (codename)	Model	Frequency (MHz)	Arch. version	Year	Total threads	Process (μm)	Transistors (millions)	Die size (mm²)	IO Pins	Power (W)	Voltage (V)	L1 Dcache (k)	L1 Icache (k)	L2 Cache (k)	L3 Cache (k)
microSPARC I (Tsunami)	TI TMS390S10 / TMX390S10	40–50	V8	1992	1×1=1	0.8	0.8	225?	288	2.5	5	2	4	none	none
microSPARC II (Swift)	Fujitsu MB86904 / Sun STP1012	60–125	V8	1994	1×1=1	0.5	2.3	233	321	5	3.3	8	16	none	none

Die photos

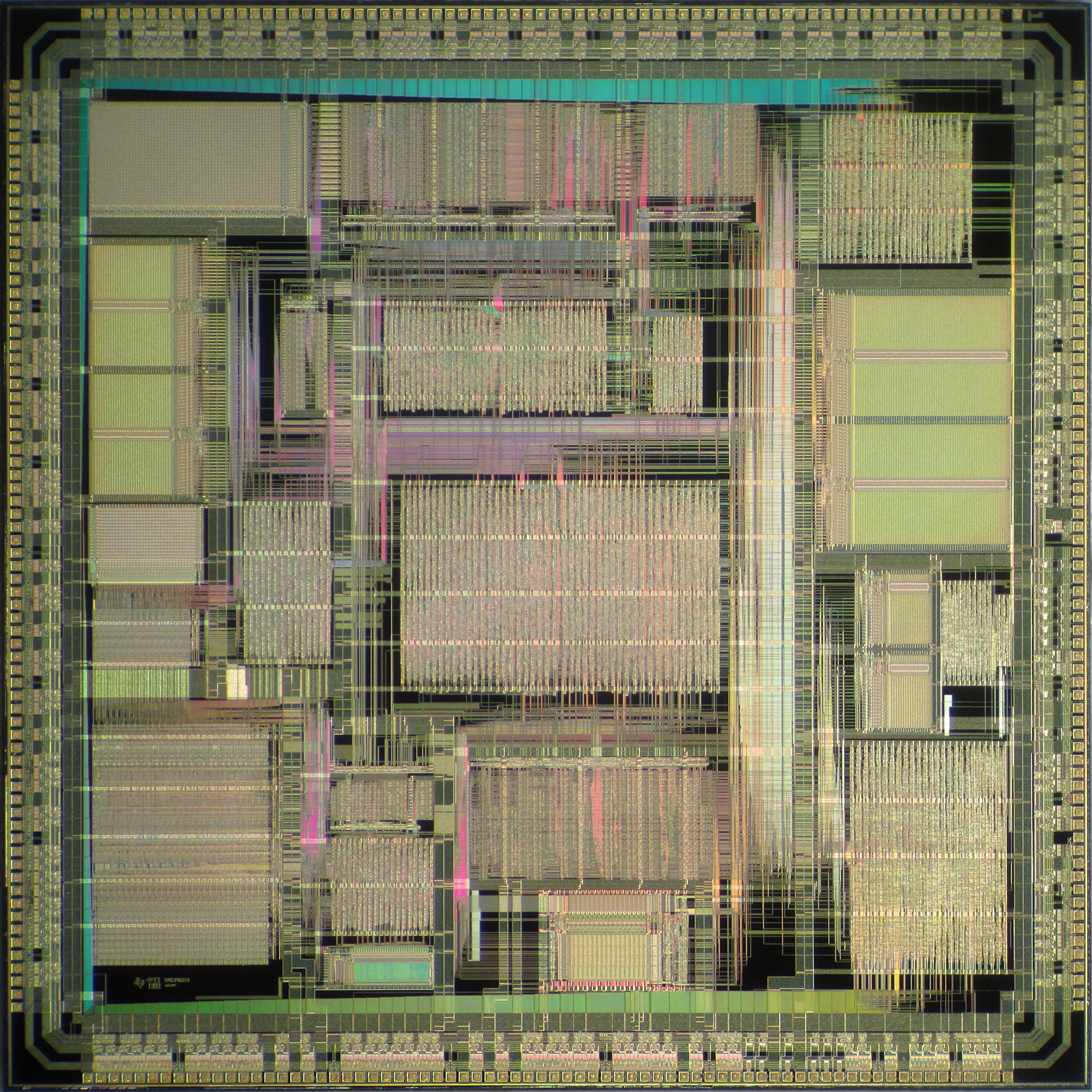
TI microSPARC I

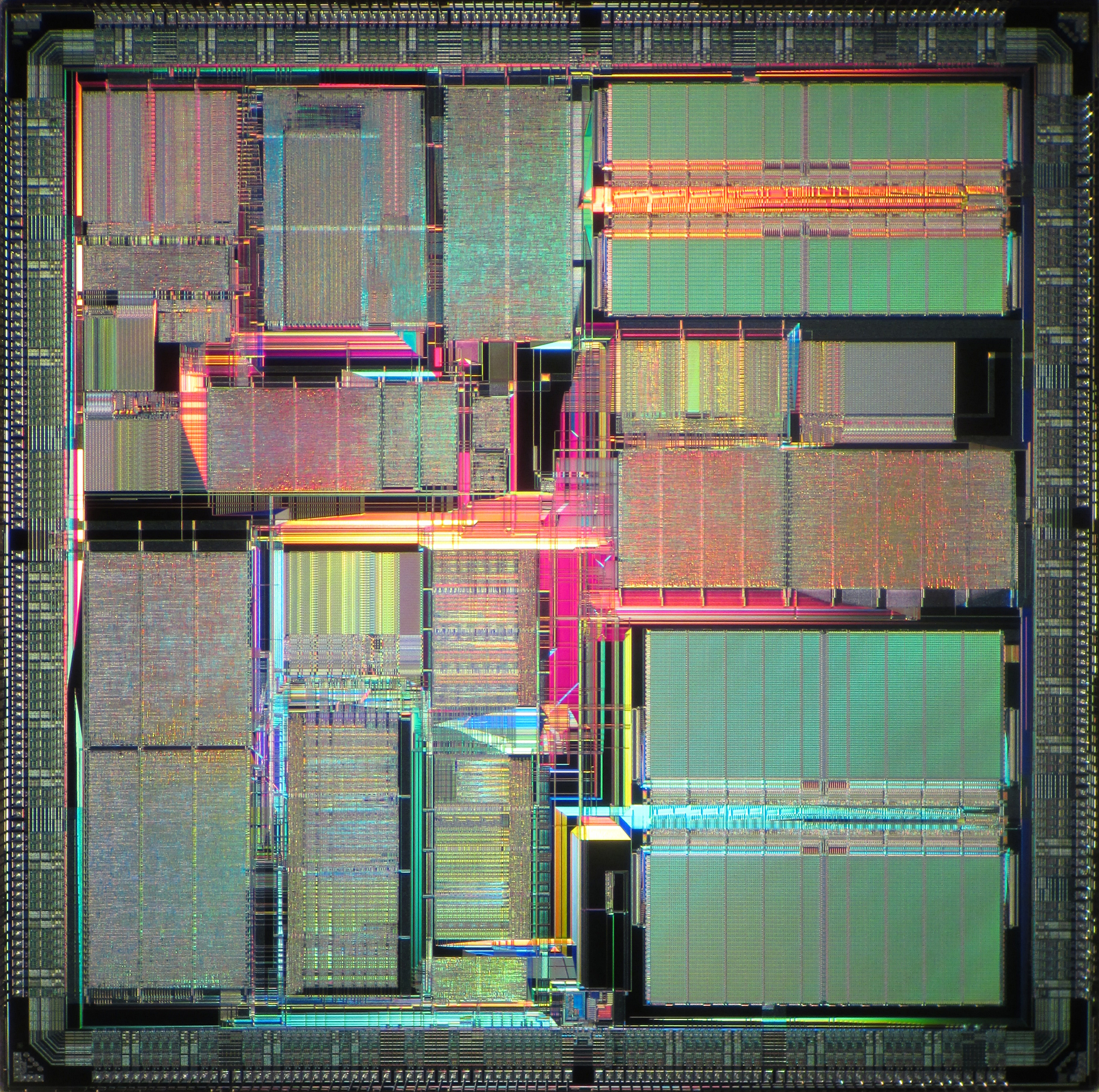
Sun microSPARC II
