= Code name =

Clandestine term

A code name, codename, call sign, or cryptonym is a code word or name used, sometimes clandestinely, to refer to another name, word, project, or person. Code names are often used for military purposes, or in espionage. They may also be used in industrial counter-espionage to protect secret projects and the like from business rivals, or to give names to projects whose marketing name has not yet been determined. Another reason for the use of names and phrases in the military is that they transmit with a lower level of cumulative errors over a walkie-talkie or radio link than actual names.

Code names are also used for commercial products, for a variety of reasons. One of them can include that a marketing name has not yet been established during product development.

== Origins ==
=== Achaemenid Empire ===
The Achaemenid Empire under Darius I employed a network of spies called the King's Eye or the King's Ear. These agents operated under anonymity, and "King's Eye" was not a specific person but rather a code name for the intelligence network that reported directly to the king.

=== Punic Wars ===
The Carthaginian general Hannibal Barca reportedly used coded references for his agents and informants in Rome and among allied territories. Some sources suggest that key figures in his intelligence operations were identified using nicknames instead of real names to avoid detection by Roman counterintelligence.

=== Rome ===
Julius Caesar used ciphers to encode messages and likely employed code names for key operatives. His famous Caesar cipher (simple letter-shifting encryption) was used to disguise military commands. He also referred to Marc Antony and other generals with shortened or altered names in correspondence to prevent interception from revealing strategic plans.

=== Jewish code names in the Bible ===
During the Jewish revolts against Rome, leaders and messengers used symbolic or misleading names in communications. The Dead Sea Scrolls reference figures such as the "Teacher of Righteousness" and the "Wicked Priest," which may have functioned as code names to obscure real identities.

=== Byzantine Empire ===
The Byzantine Empire's intelligence agents, particularly under Emperor Justinian I, operated under codenames or titles rather than real identities. Procopius suggests that spies within the Persian and Gothic courts were assigned allegorical names to protect them from discovery.

== Military origins ==
During World War I, names common to the Allies referring to nations, cities, geographical features, military units, military operations, diplomatic meetings, places, and individual persons were agreed upon, adapting pre-war naming procedures in use by the governments concerned. In the British case names were administered and controlled by the Inter Services Security Board (ISSB) staffed by the War Office. This procedure was coordinated with the United States when it entered the war. Random lists of names were issued to users in alphabetical blocks of ten words and were selected as required. Words became available for re-use after six months and unused allocations could be reassigned at discretion and according to need. Judicious selection from the available allocation could result in clever meanings and result in an aptronym or backronym, although policy was to select words that had no obviously deducible connection with what they were supposed to be concealing. Those for the major conference meetings had a partial naming sequence referring to devices or instruments which had a number as part of their meaning, e.g., the third meeting was "TRIDENT". Joseph Stalin, whose last name means "man of steel", was given the name "GLYPTIC", meaning "an image carved out of stone".

- Reference: Glossary of Names from U.S. Army in World War II – Washington Command Post: The Operations Division
  - World War II Allied Operations
  - Abbreviations, Acronyms, Codewords, Terms Appearing in WWII Histories and Documents
  - Information from original files held at The National Archives (formerly The Public Record Office) which hold the publicly available records of central government for the UK

=== German code names ===
Ewen Montagu, a British Naval intelligence officer, discloses in Beyond Top Secret Ultra that during World War II, Nazi Germany habitually used ad hoc code names as nicknames which often openly revealed or strongly hinted at their content or function.

Some German code names:

- Golfplatz (German for "golf course") – Britain, employed by the Abwehr
- Samland – The United States (from Uncle Sam), employed by the Abwehr
- Heimdall (a god whose power was "to see for a hundred miles") – long-range radar
- Wotan – an aerial bombing navigation system. Knowing that the god Wotan had only one eye, R. V. Jones, a British scientist working for Air Intelligence of the British Air Ministry and SIS inferred that the device used a single beam and from that determined, correctly, how it must work. A counter-system was quickly created which made Wotan useless.
- Operation Seelöwe (Sea-lion) – plans to invade Britain (lions being prominent in the coat of arms of the United Kingdom)
- Operation Barbarossa (Frederick Barbarossa) – plans to go east and invade the Soviet Union

Conversely, Operation Wacht am Rhein (Watch on the Rhine) was deliberately named to suggest the opposite of its purpose – a defensive "watch" as opposed to a massive blitzkrieg operation, just as was Operation Weserübung (Weser-exercise), which signified the plans to invade Norway and Denmark in April 1940.

=== Code names of other powers ===
Britain and the United States developed the security policy of assigning code names intended to give no such clues to the uninitiated. For example, the British counter measures against the V-2 was called Operation Crossbow. The atomic bomb project centered in New Mexico was called the Manhattan Project, derived from the Manhattan Engineer District which managed the program. The code name for the American A-12 / SR-71 spy plane project, producing the fastest, highest-flying aircraft in the world, was Oxcart. The American group that planned that country's first ICBM was called the Teapot Committee.

Although the word could stand for a menace to shipping (in this case, that of Japan), the American code name for the attack on the subtropical island of Okinawa in World War II was Operation Iceberg. The Soviet Union's project to base missiles in Cuba was named Operation Anadyr after their closest bomber base to the US (just across the Bering Strait from Nome, Alaska). The names of colors are generally avoided in American practice to avoid confusion with meteorological reporting practices. Britain, in contrast, made deliberately non-meaningful use of them, through the system of rainbow codes.

=== Aircraft recognition reporting names ===
Although German and Italian aircraft were not given code names by their Allied opponents, in 1942, Captain Frank T. McCoy, an intelligence officer of the USAAF, invented a system for the identification of Japanese military aircraft. Initially using short, "hillbilly" boys' names such as "Pete", "Jake", and "Rufe", the system was later extended to include girls' names and names of trees and birds, and became widely used by the Allies throughout the Pacific theater of war. This type of naming scheme differs from the other use of code names in that it does not have to be kept secret, but is a means of identification where the official nomenclature is unknown or uncertain.

The policy of recognition reporting names was continued into the Cold War for Soviet, other Warsaw Pact, and Communist Chinese aircraft. Although this was started by the Air Standards Co-ordinating Committee (ASCC) formed by the United States, United Kingdom, Canada, Australia, and New Zealand, it was extended throughout NATO as the NATO reporting name for aircraft, rockets and missiles. These names were considered by the Soviets as being like a nickname given to one's unit by the opponents in a battle. The Soviets did not like the Sukhoi Su-25 getting the code name "Frogfoot". However, some names were appropriate, such as "Condor" for the Antonov An-124, or, most famously, "Fulcrum" for the Mikoyan MiG-29, which had a "pivotal" role in Soviet air-strategy.

Code names were adopted by the following process. Aerial or space reconnaissance would note a new aircraft at a Warsaw Pact airbase. The intelligence units would then assign it a code name consisting of the official abbreviation of the base, then a letter, for example, "Ram-A", signifying an aircraft sighted at Ramenskoye Airport. Missiles were given designations like "TT-5", for the fifth rocket seen at Tyura-Tam. When more information resulted in knowing a bit about what a missile was used for, it would be given a designation like "SS-6", for the sixth surface-to-surface missile design reported. Finally, when either an aircraft or a missile was able to be photographed with a hand-held camera, instead of a reconnaissance aircraft, it was given a name like "Flanker" or "Scud" – always an English word, as international pilots worldwide are required to learn English. The Soviet manufacturer or designation – which may be mistakenly inferred by NATO – has nothing to do with it.

Jet-powered aircraft received two-syllable names like Foxbat, while propeller aircraft were designated with short names like Bull. Fighter names began with an "F", bombers with a "B", cargo aircraft with a "C". Training aircraft and reconnaissance aircraft were grouped under the word "miscellaneous", and received "M". The same convention applies to missiles, with air-launched ground attack missiles beginning with the letter "K" and surface-to-surface missiles (ranging from intercontinental ballistic missiles to antitank rockets) with the letter "S", air-to-air missiles "A", and surface-to-air missiles "G".

=== Military operations since Churchill ===
Throughout the Second World War, the British allocation practice favored one-word code names (Jubilee, Frankton). That of the Americans favored longer compound words, although the name Overlord was personally chosen by Winston Churchill himself. Many examples of both types can be cited, as can exceptions.

Winston Churchill was particular about the quality of code names. He insisted that code words, especially for dangerous operations, would be not overly grand nor petty nor common. One emotional goal he mentions is to never have to report to anyone that their son "was killed in an operation called 'Bunnyhug' or 'Ballyhoo'."

Presently, British forces tend to use one-word names, presumably in keeping with their post-World War II policy of reserving single words for operations and two-word names for exercises. British operation code names are usually randomly generated by a computer and rarely reveal its components or any political implications unlike the American names (e.g., the 2003 invasion of Iraq was called "Operation Telic" compared to Americans' "Operation Iraqi Freedom", obviously chosen for propaganda rather than secrecy). Americans prefer two-word names, whereas the Canadians and Australians use either. The French military currently prefer names drawn from nature (such as colors or the names of animals), for instance Opération Daguet ("brocket deer") or Opération Baliste ("Triggerfish"). The CIA uses alphabetical prefixes to designate the part of the agency supporting an operation.

In many cases with the United States, the first word of the name has to do with the intent of the program. Programs with "have" as the first word, such as Have Blue for the stealth fighter development, are developmental programs, not meant to produce a production aircraft. Programs that start with Senior, such as Senior Trend for the F-117, are for aircraft in testing meant to enter production.

In the United States code names are commonly set entirely in upper case. This is not done in other countries, though for the UK in British documents the code name is in upper case while operation is shortened to OP e.g., "Op. TELIC".

This presents an opportunity for a bit of public-relations (Operation Just Cause), or for controversy over the naming choice (Operation Infinite Justice, renamed Operation Enduring Freedom). Computers are now used to aid in the selection. And further, there is a distinction between the secret names during former wars and the published names of recent ones.

== Project code name ==
A project code name is a code name (usually a single word, short phrase or acronym) which is given to a project being developed by industry, academia, government, and other concerns.

Project code names are typically used for several reasons:

- To uniquely identify the project within the organization. Code names are frequently chosen to be outside the normal business/domain jargon that the organization uses, in order to not conflict with established terminology.
- To assist with maintaining secrecy of the project against rival concerns. Some corporations routinely change project names in order to further confuse competitors.
- When the goal of the project is to develop one or more commercial products, use of a code name allows the eventual choice of product nomenclature (the name the product(s) are marketed and sold under) to be decoupled from the development effort. This is especially important when one project generates multiple products, or multiple projects are needed to produce a single product. This allows for subprojects to be given a separate identity from the main project.
- To decouple an early phase of a development effort (which may have failed) from a subsequent phase (which may be given a "fresh start") as a political tool.
- To prevent casual observers from concluding that a pre-release version is a new release of the product, thus helping reduce confusion.

Different organizations have different policies regarding the use and publication of project code names. Some companies take great pains to never discuss or disclose project code names outside of the company (other than with outside entities who have a need to know, and typically are bound with a non-disclosure agreement). Other companies never use them in official or formal communications, but widely disseminate project code names through informal channels (often in an attempt to create a marketing buzz for the project). Still others (such as Microsoft) discuss code names publicly, and routinely use project code names on beta releases and such, but remove them from final product(s). In the case of Windows 95, the code name "CHICAGO" was left embedded in the INF File structure and remained required through Windows Me. At the other end of the spectrum, Apple includes the project code names for Mac OS X as part of the official name of the final product, a practice that was started in 2002 with Mac OS X v10.2 "Jaguar". Google and the AOSP also used this for their Android operating system until 2013, where the code name was different from the release name.

== Notable code names ==
=== Military ===
- Operation Anthropoid – assassination of top Nazi Reinhard Heydrich in Prague
- Operation Arc Light – United States Air Force B-52 bombing campaign during the Vietnam War
- Operation Barbarossa – German invasion of the Soviet Union
- Operation Market Garden – failed invasion of Germany (1944)
- Operation Morero – South African Special Forces sent to the Central African Republic to protect president François Bozizé.
- Operation Neptune Spear – The operation, was carried out in a Central Intelligence Agency-led operation in which Osama bin Laden, the founder and head of the Islamist militant group al-Qaeda, was killed in Pakistan on May 2, 2011, by Navy SEALs of the U.S. Naval Special Warfare Development Group.
  - "Geronimo", the code name for Osama bin Laden during Operation Neptune's Spear
- Operation Desert Storm – The US code name of the airland conflict from 17 January 1991, through 11 April 1991 in Kuwait during the First Gulf War.
- Operation Overlord – Allied invasion of Normandy
- Operation Rolling Thunder – the sustained bombing campaign conducted against North Vietnam by the United States and South Vietnam
- Operation Sea Lion – the planned invasion of Britain by Nazi Germany which was never carried out
- Operation Torch – British-American invasion of North Africa in 1942
- Manhattan Project (with Trinity, Little Boy, and Fat Man) – U.S. nuclear weapons program during World War II
- MKULTRA – CIA project (an attempt at mind control technology & technique)
- Tank – originally a code name adopted in 1915 by the British government for the first tracked armoured vehicles, which were then under development
- Tube Alloys – British nuclear program
- Operation Unthinkable - Winston Churchill's plan to invade the Soviet Union
- SVO, euphemism for the 2022 Russian invasion of Ukraine

=== Commercial ===
- AMD have also been naming their CPUs since 90 nm generations under the K8 micro-architecture after the name of cities around the world. For the CPUs under the Phenom brand, the names of stars were used as code names. For Opteron server CPUs and platforms, cities related to the Ferrari Formula One team were used. Mobile platforms are named after birds (except for Puma). For example:
  - Single-core Athlon 64 and Athlon 64 FX : Newcastle, Venice, San Diego and Lima
  - Dual-core Athlon 64 X2 and Athlon 64 FX: Manchester, Toledo, Windsor and Brisbane
  - Phenom CPUs: Agena (Beta Centauri), Toliman (Alpha Centauri), Kuma (Nu Draconis), Deneb (Alpha Cygni), Propus (Eta Geminorum), Heka (Lambda Orionis), Rana (Delta Eridani), Regor (Gamma Velorum)
  - Opteron CPUs: Barcelona, Shanghai, São Paulo, Istanbul
  - Server platforms: Catalunya, Fiorano, Maranello
  - Mobile CPUs: Griffin, Lion, Swift
  - Mobile platforms: Kite, Puma, Shrike, Eagle
- Apple currently names the major releases of macOS (previously known as Mac OS X) after major California landmarks, such as Mavericks (10.9), Yosemite (10.10), El Capitan (10.11), Sierra (10.12 ), High Sierra (10.13) Mojave (10.14), Catalina (10.15), Big Sur (11.0), Monterey (12.0), Ventura (13.0), and Sonoma (14.0). Previous releases were named after big cats: Cheetah (10.0), Puma (10.1), Jaguar (10.2), Panther (10.3), Tiger (10.4), Leopard (10.5), Snow Leopard (10.6), Lion (10.7), and Mountain Lion (10.8). Other former code names include:
  - Composers, such as Copland, after composer Aaron Copland; and Gershwin, after George Gershwin.
  - Women's names, e.g. Jennifer (rumored for the Macintosh IIx), and Lisa.
  - Varieties of apples, including Cortland for the Apple IIGS, and Macintosh (from McIntosh).
  - Carl Sagan, which was used for the Power Macintosh 7100 while it was under development. In 1994 astronomer Carl Sagan filed two lawsuits against Apple related to that usage, and lost both, reaching an out-of-court settlement with the company.
- Intel often names CPU projects after rivers in the American West, particularly in the state of Oregon (where most of Intel's CPU projects are designed). Examples include Willamette, Deschutes, Yamhill, Tualatin, and Clackamas. See List of Intel codenames.
- Microsoft often names projects (in particular, versions of the Microsoft Windows operating systems) after place names. Examples include Chicago (Windows 95), Daytona (Windows NT 3.5), Memphis (Windows 98), Whistler (Windows XP) and Longhorn (Windows Vista).
- For a period of time, Mozilla used code names which are mostly named after national parks to reference different versions of the Mozilla Firefox browser:
  - Firefox 2.0: Bon Echo
  - Firefox 3.0: Gran Paradiso
  - Firefox 3.5: Shiretoko
  - Firefox 3.6: Namoroka
  - Firefox 4.0: Tumucumaque
  - Firefox pre-beta: Aurora
  - Firefox trunk builds: Nightly
- Nintendo often uses code names for new consoles. The best-known is that of Wii, which was code-named Revolution for over a year. Others include the GameCube's code name of Dolphin, the Game Boy Advance's code name of Atlantis, the Nintendo 64 as Project Reality, the DS code name Project Nitro, the Game Boy Micro code name Oxygen, the Wii U code name Project Cafe, the Switch code name NX, and the Switch 2 code name Ounce.
- Return of the Jedi was code-named "Blue Harvest" while in production and principal photography. This was reportedly to prevent disruption by fans and the media as well as to avoid price gouging by local merchants and vendors.
- The Chamber of Secrets sequel of the Harry Potter film series was code-named "Incident of 57th Street" to disguise the production from its increasingly rabid fanbase, who would seek out filming locations and disrupt production.

== See also ==
- List of computer technology code names
- CIA cryptonyms
- Code word (figure of speech)
- List of U.S. Department of Defense and partner code names
- List of Microsoft codenames
- Military Operations listed by code name
- Rainbow Codes
- NATO reporting name
- Pseudonym, the term for a code name when applied to a single person
- Secret Service codename
- Sensitive Compartmented Information
- Working title
