= SPARCstation 5 =

Sun Microsystems workstation

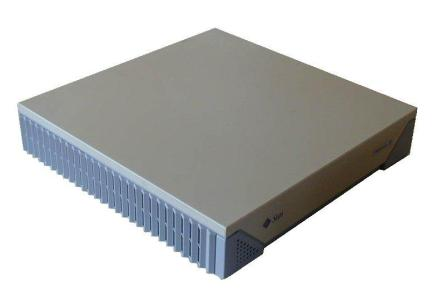
- Codename: Aurora
- Manufacturer: Sun Microsystems
- Product family: SPARCstation
- Type: Workstation
- Released: March 29, 1994
- Availability: March 29, 1994
- Introductory price: US$3,995–11,395
- Units sold: Over 400,000
- Operating system: SunOS; Solaris
- CPU: microSPARC-II at 70–110 MHz or Fujitsu TurboSPARC at 160–170 MHz
- Memory: 8–256 MB
- Dimensions: 41.5 x 41.5 x 8 cm
- Weight: ~10 kg
- Predecessor: SPARCclassic
- Successor: Ultra 5
- Related: SPARCstation 4
- Website: sun.com at the Wayback Machine (archived 1997-02-11)

SPARCstation 5 (code-named Aurora) is a workstation made by Sun Microsystems as part of their SPARCstation family. Released on March 29, 1994, the SPARCstation sold for between US$3,995 at the low end to US$11,395 at the high end (equivalent to $8,680–24,750 in 2025). Sun positioned the SPARCstation 5 as a low-cost model in the SPARCstation range, set to replace the earlier SPARCclassic from 1992. It is based on the sun4m architecture, and is enclosed in a pizza-box chassis. Sun also offered a SPARCserver 5 without a framebuffer. A simplified version of the SPARCstation 5 was released in February 1995 as the SPARCstation 4. Sun also marketed these same machines under the "Netra" brand, without framebuffers or keyboards and preconfigured with all the requisite software to be used as web servers. It was the fastest-selling Unix workstation up to that point, with 100,000 units selling within nine months of its introduction. Over 400,000 SPARCstation 5s were sold across its entire lifespan. Sun replaced it with the Ultra 5 in January 1998.

== Specifications ==
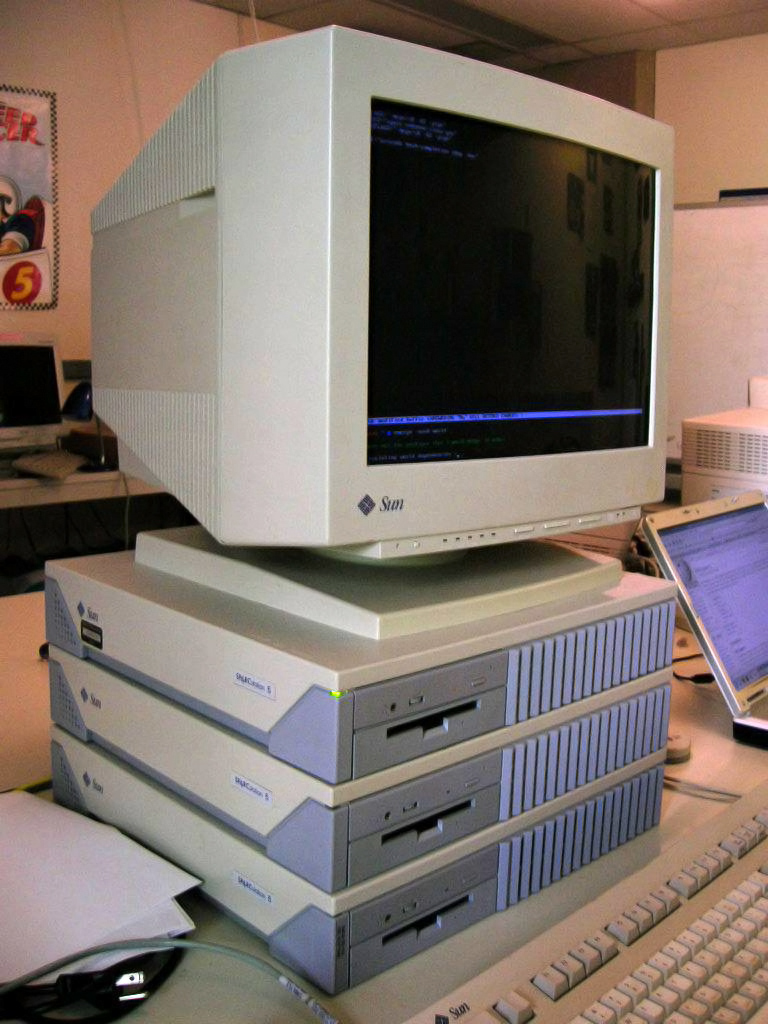
A "SparcStack" of SPARCstation 5s in the Evergreen State College advanced operating system lab

=== CPU support ===
The SPARCstation 5 may incorporate one of the following processors: 70, 85, or 110 MHz Sun Microsystems microSPARC-II, or a 170 MHz Fujitsu Microelectronics, Inc. (FMI) TurboSPARC. Fujitsu also provided a 160 MHz TurboSPARC CPU Upgrade Kit for upgrading 70, 85 and 110 MHz microSPARC-II models. The SPARCstation 5 has no MBus and thus is limited to use as a single-processor machine.

=== Memory ===
The SPARCstation 5 has eight DSIMM slots for memory expansion. Slots can be filled individually with either 8 MB or 32 MB modules giving a maximum of 256 MB memory. The SPARCstation 4 uses the same memory.

=== Disk drives ===
The SPARCstation 5 can hold two internal 80-pin SCA, single-ended, fast-narrow SCSI drives, a SCSI CD-ROM drive and a floppy. It also supports external SCSI devices. There is no IDE/ATAPI support.

=== Network support ===
The SPARCstation 5 comes with an on-board AMD Lance ethernet chipset providing 10BASE-T networking as standard and 10BASE2 and 10BASE5 via an AUI transceiver. A 10/100 Mbit/s hme "Happy Meal" NIC can be added for faster connections. The OpenBoot ROM is able to boot from network, using RARP and TFTP. Like all other SPARCstation systems, the SPARCstation 5 holds system information such as MAC address and serial number in NVRAM. If the battery on this chip dies, then the system will not be able to boot until the NVRAM is reprogrammed.

=== Expansion / AFX ===
The SPARCstation 5 has three SBus expansion slots which are typical of Sun computer equipment of this era. The third of these shares its expansion backplate and physical space with a special AFX connector which was unique to the SPARCstation 5. Only one card was released for this slot, known as the S24 or TCX. This was a framebuffer that allowed the use of 24-bit colour graphics instead of the 8-bit colour of the SBus CG6 card, also known as the LEGO (Low End Graphics Option).

== SPARCstation 4 ==
SPARCstation 4
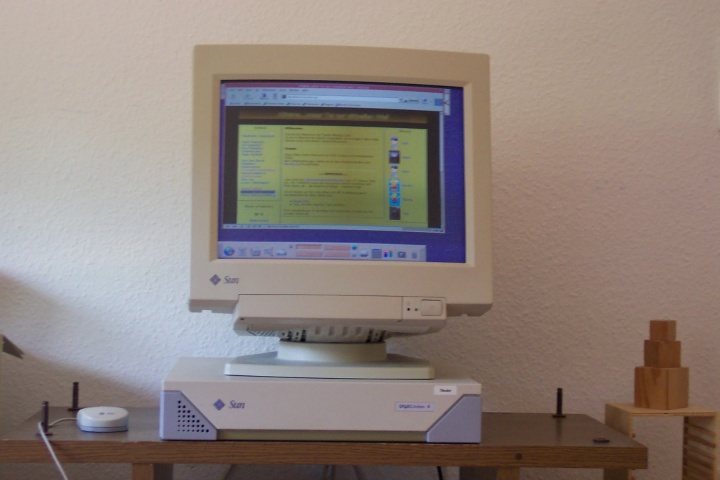
- Codename: Perigee
- Manufacturer: Sun Microsystems
- Product family: SPARCstation
- Type: Workstation
- Released: February 6, 1995
- Availability: February 6, 1995
- Introductory price: US$3,995
- Operating system: SunOS; Solaris
- CPU: microSPARC-II at 70–110 MHz
- Memory: 8–160 MB
- Predecessor: SPARCclassic
- Website: sun.com at the Wayback Machine (archived 1996-12-20)

The SPARCstation 4 (code-named Perigee) was introduced on February 6, 1995, to provide a low price point (US$3,995) and to replace the SPARCclassic. Although offered with the same 70, 85, or 110 MHz microSPARC-II processor as the SPARCstation 5, it has only one SBus expansion slot instead of three, a single 1.05 GB hard drive, and maximum memory capacity of 160 MB instead of 256 MB (five DSIMM slots). Instead of the built-in audio of the SPARCstation 5, the SPARCstation 4 requires an optional module, installed in its own dedicated slot. The system includes a built-in 8-bit color pixel-accelerated graphics adapter (TCX) capable of 1152×900 (or 1280×1024 with an optional 1 MB VSIMM), and a new lower-cost, 17-inch monitor was introduced as an option. There is no AFX graphics port. It was the final entry in the SPARCstation family before it was replaced by the Ultra family of UltraSPARC-powered workstations in November 1995.

The SPARCstation 4 has a standard AUI Ethernet connector, unlike the SPARCstation 5 which requires a special cable to mate with a non-standard connector.

== SPARC Xterminal 1 ==
Sun used the same enclosure as the SPARCstation 4 for the SPARC Xterminal 1, which was, as the name implies, marketed as an X terminal, with no local storage. Unlike the earlier SPARCclassic X, it did not use the same motherboard as the workstation it was derived from, instead using a lower-powered 50 MHz microSPARC processor and expansion from its base memory of 8 MB to 128 MB rather than 160 MB (four DSIMM slots).

Rather than running Solaris, the SPARC Xterminal 1 and SPARCclassic X loaded and ran special software over the network.

Sun offered an upgrade kit to a full workstation that included a swap to a SPARCstation 4 motherboard, a hard drive and additional memory.

== Operating systems ==
The following operating systems will run on a SPARCstation 5:

- SunOS 4.1.3_U1B onwards
- Solaris 2.3 Edition II to Solaris 9
- Linux - Most distributions of Linux have compatibility issues with TurboSPARC variants
- MirBSD/sparc
- NetBSD/sparc
- OpenBSD/sparc
- NeXTSTEP - TurboSPARC variants not supported
- OPENSTEP/Mach - TurboSPARC variants not supported
