= STAS =

Stas or STAS may refer to:

== People ==
- Stas (given name), a reduced form of Stanislav, Anastasius or Eustachius
- Stas (surname)
- Stasia "Stas" Irons, musician

== Other uses ==
- Short Term Air Supply
- Science and Technology Adviser to the Secretary of State
- Société de Transports de l'Agglomération Stéphanoise, a public transport executive and operator.
- Stewart Army Subpost in New Windsor, NY
- Superman: The Animated Series, an American animated television series based on the DC Comics superhero Superman.

== See also ==
- STA (disambiguation) for the singular of STAs
