= Stach =

Stach may refer to:

- Stach (surname)
- Stach Konwa (died c. 1734), legendary Polish hero
- 93256 Stach, an asteroid
- STACH (acronym) - status change

== See also ==
- Stas (disambiguation)
- Stash (disambiguation)
- "Stach Stach", a 2002 song by Michael Youn and his band Bratisla Boys
