= SCSI connector =

Electrical connector used for SCSI

A SCSI connector (/ˈskʌzi/ SKUZ-ee) is used to connect computer parts that communicate with each other via the SCSI standard. Generally, two connectors, designated male and female, plug together to form a connection that allows two components, such as a computer and a disk drive, to communicate with each other. SCSI connectors can be electrical or optical connectors. There have been a large variety of SCSI connectors in use at one time or another in the computer industry. Manufacturers have frequently chosen connectors based on factors of size, cost, or convenience at the expense of compatibility.

Twenty-five years of evolution and three major revisions of the standards resulted in requirements for Parallel SCSI connectors that could handle an 8, 16 or 32 bit wide bus running at 5, 10 or 20 megatransfers per second, with single-ended or differential signaling. Serial SCSI added another three transport types, each with one or more connector types.

SCSI makes use of cables to connect devices. In a typical example, a socket on a computer motherboard would have one end of a cable plugged into it, while the other end of the cable is plugged into a disk drive. Some cables have different types of connectors on them, and some cables can have as many as 16 connectors (allowing 16 devices to be wired together). Different types of connectors may be used for devices inside a computer cabinet than for external devices such as scanners or external disk drives.

== Nomenclature ==
Many connector designations consist of an abbreviation for the connector family, followed by a number indicating the number of pins. For example, CN36 (also written CN-36 or CN 36) would be a 36-pin Centronics-style connector. For some connectors (such as the D-subminiature family), use of the hyphen or space is more common, for others (like the DD50), less so.

== Parallel SCSI ==
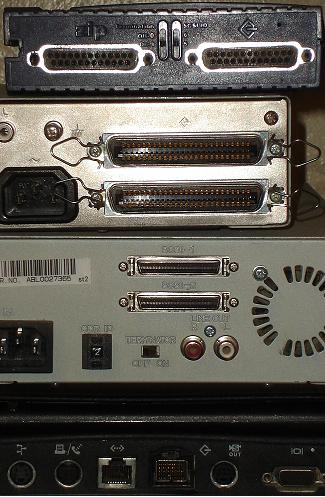
A stack of external SCSI devices displaying various SCSI connectors

Parallel SCSI allows for attachment of up to 8 devices (8-bit Narrow SCSI) or 16 devices (16-bit Wide SCSI) to the SCSI bus. The SCSI Host controller takes up one slot on the SCSI bus, which limits the number of devices allowed on the bus to 7 or 15 devices, respectively. SCSI Host Controllers may have multiple SCSI buses (e.g. Adaptec AHA-2940) to allow more SCSI devices to be attached.

=== Internal ===
==== IDC header ====
Early generations of SCSI hard drive assemblies generally had two connectors (power and communication). Some very early 16-bit units used two data connectors, with three connectors in total. The power connector was typically the same 4-pin female Molex connector used in many other internal computer devices. The communication connectors on the drives were usually a 50 (for 8-bit SCSI) or 68-pin male (for 16-bit SCSI) IDC header which has two rows of pins, 0.1 inches (2.54 mm) apart. This connector has no retaining screws to secure the connectors together, and ribbon cables are both inconveniently wide and somewhat delicate, so this connector style was primarily used for connections inside of a computer or peripheral enclosure (as opposed to connecting two enclosures to each other). Thus it is often called an internal SCSI connector. This type of header was used in a typical desktop PC until around 2010, including the 40-pin (two rows of 20) version used for ATA fixed and optical disk drives.

While the female connector is slotted such that a cable with a matching keyed male connector can not be inserted upside-down, some manufacturers (including Sun Microsystems) supplied internal cables with male connectors that did not have the key, allowing for incorrect (and possibly damaging) connections.

In most cases, the host adapter would have a similar header-style connection. In some cases, though, the host adapter end of the cable would use a different connector. For example, in the Sun 260 series chassis (used for the Sun 3/260 and Sun 4/260 computers), the connector was the same 3-row 96-pin connector used to attach peripheral cards to the VMEbus backplane.

==== SCA ====
Eventually, there was a desire to combine power and data signals into a single connector. This allows for quick drive replacement, more reliable connections, and is more compact. Most late parallel SCSI disk drives utilize an 80-pin SCA (Single Connector Attachment) connector. This connector includes a power connection and also has long and short pins which enable hot swapping. Note that this connector is primarily found on disk drive HDAs (and of course, the mating enclosure backplane connector).

=== External ===
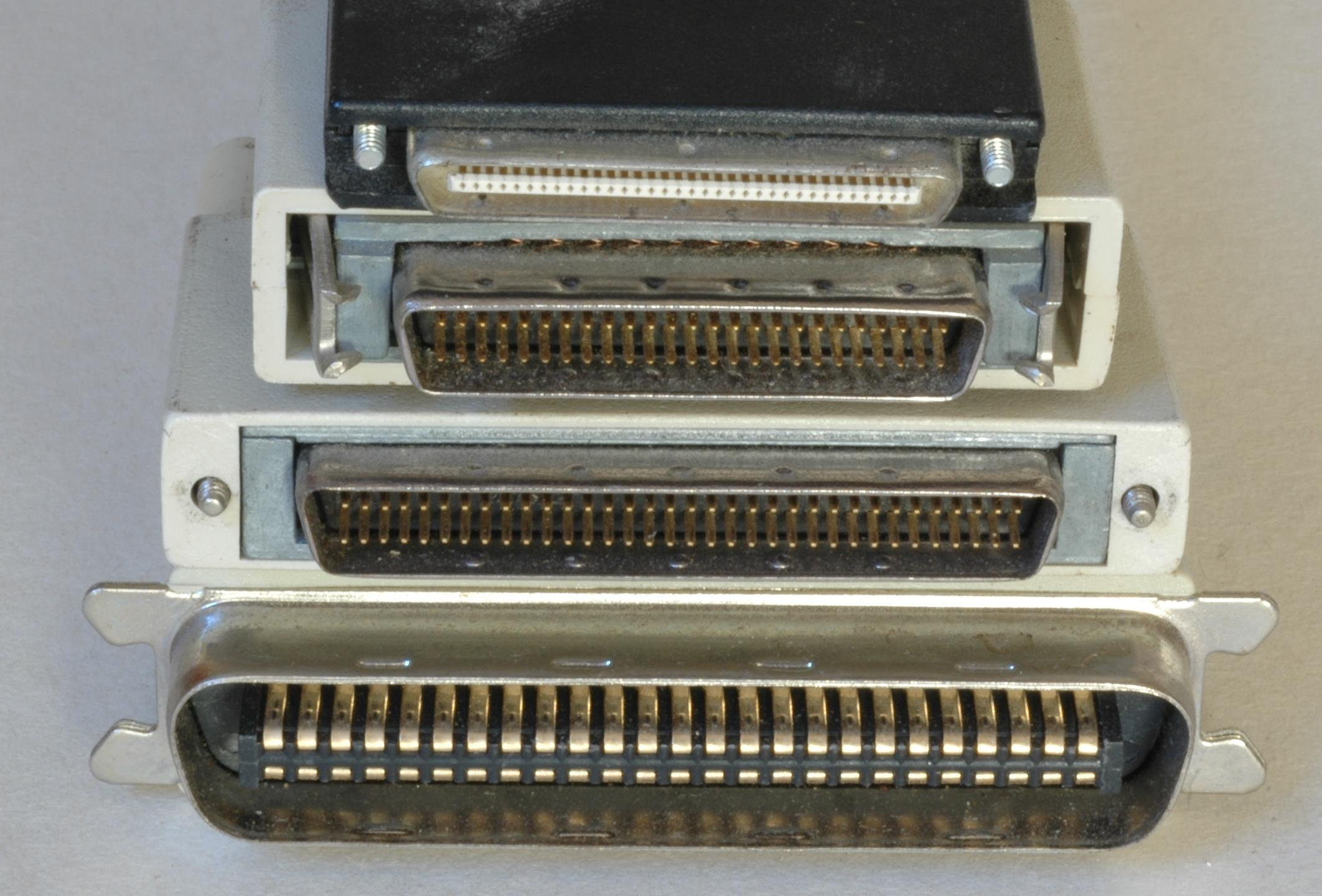
From top to bottom: VHDCI, HD50, HD68, CN50

Most typically, external drive enclosures will have female connectors, while cables will have two male connectors. As with everything SCSI, there are exceptions.

==== First generation ====
Standardization was perhaps less consistent in the early days of SCSI manufacture.

Early SCSI interfaces commonly used a 50-pin micro ribbon connector. This connector is similar to the 36-pin connector used by Centronics for the parallel interface on their printers; thus the connector became popularly known as Centronics SCSI or CN-50. It is also referred to as a SCSI-1 connector; since many connectors have been used for SCSI-1, this can be confusing.

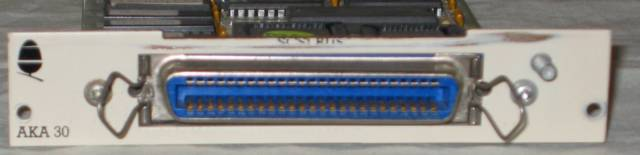
SCSI-1 card with an external Centronics port which requires a terminator, from an Acorn computer.

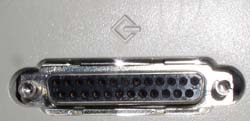
Old Macintosh DB-25 SCSI port (narrow)

Apple used DB-25 connectors, which, having only 25 pins rather than 50, were smaller and less expensive to make, but decreased signal integrity (increasing crosstalk) and cannot be used with differential signaling. Furthermore, DB-25s were commonly used for RS-232 serial cables and also to connect parallel printers, meaning that users might accidentally try to use completely inappropriate cables, since the printer and serial cables would fit the connector properly and be hard to visually distinguish.

Sun Microsystems and Data General used a 50-pin 3-row DD-50 connector, which was sometimes called a DB-50 or HDB-50. Sun also used DB-25s on a few products.

Digital Equipment Corporation mostly used the CN-50, but the VAXstation 3100 and DECstation 3100/2100 made use of a MALE 68-pin connector on the rear of the workstation. This connector looks like it would be a high-density wide SCSI-2 connector, but it is actually 8-bit SCSI-1.

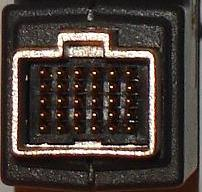
Macintosh HDI-30 SCSI male Connector (narrow)

Apple Macintosh laptops used a squarish external SCSI connector called an HDI-30 (High Density Interconnect) on the laptop itself (not on the peripheral end of the cable, unless two laptops were being connected). These machines also had the interesting ability to work in SCSI Disk Mode, meaning that they could appear to be disk drives when attached to another computer's SCSI controller. (Note: The feature was later reimplemented over FireWire and Thunderbolt for later, non-SCSI Mac hardware.)

IBM's early RS6000 workstations sometimes used a High Density Centronics connector, more correctly known as a Mini Delta Ribbon (MDR) connector, which was a Centronics-style connector with smaller pins and shell. It had 60 pins and is thus known as the HDCN60.

Certain Japanese digital camera manufacturers wanted to put SCSI into their equipment, but conventional connectors would have been too large. Like IBM, they used a miniaturized Centronics connector, but this one had 50 pins and was called the HPCN50.

Some manufacturers used a DC-37 connector, often referred to as a DB-37. These will most commonly be seen on three-cable systems, which are typically 16-bit or 32-bit Wide SCSI systems. Extra confusion is generated here since this connector was also frequently used with SMD disk drives, which are completely incompatible with SCSI drives.

==== SCSI-2 ====
With the arrival of SCSI-2, the situation was a bit less chaotic. For narrow SCSI, most manufacturers used the Amplimite .050 connector, also sometimes referred to as a High Density or HD50. This connector has two rows of 25 pins and a trapezoidal (D-shaped) shell, and is about 1 3/8” (36mm) wide.

A few vendors did use the Micro Centronics 50, also known as Mini Delta Ribbon, and IBM continued to use the HDCN60 on some RS-6000 systems.

The Amplimite and MDR connectors are similar in shape and size, but can be distinguished by the former using pin contacts and the latter using wipers.

For Wide SCSI-2, the most common connector was the larger 68-pin sibling of the HD50, known as the HD68, MiniD68, HPDB68, and sometimes as SCSI-3. This is about 1 7/8 inches (48 mm) wide. IBM used the HDCN68 on some RS-6000 systems.

==== Post SCSI-2 ====
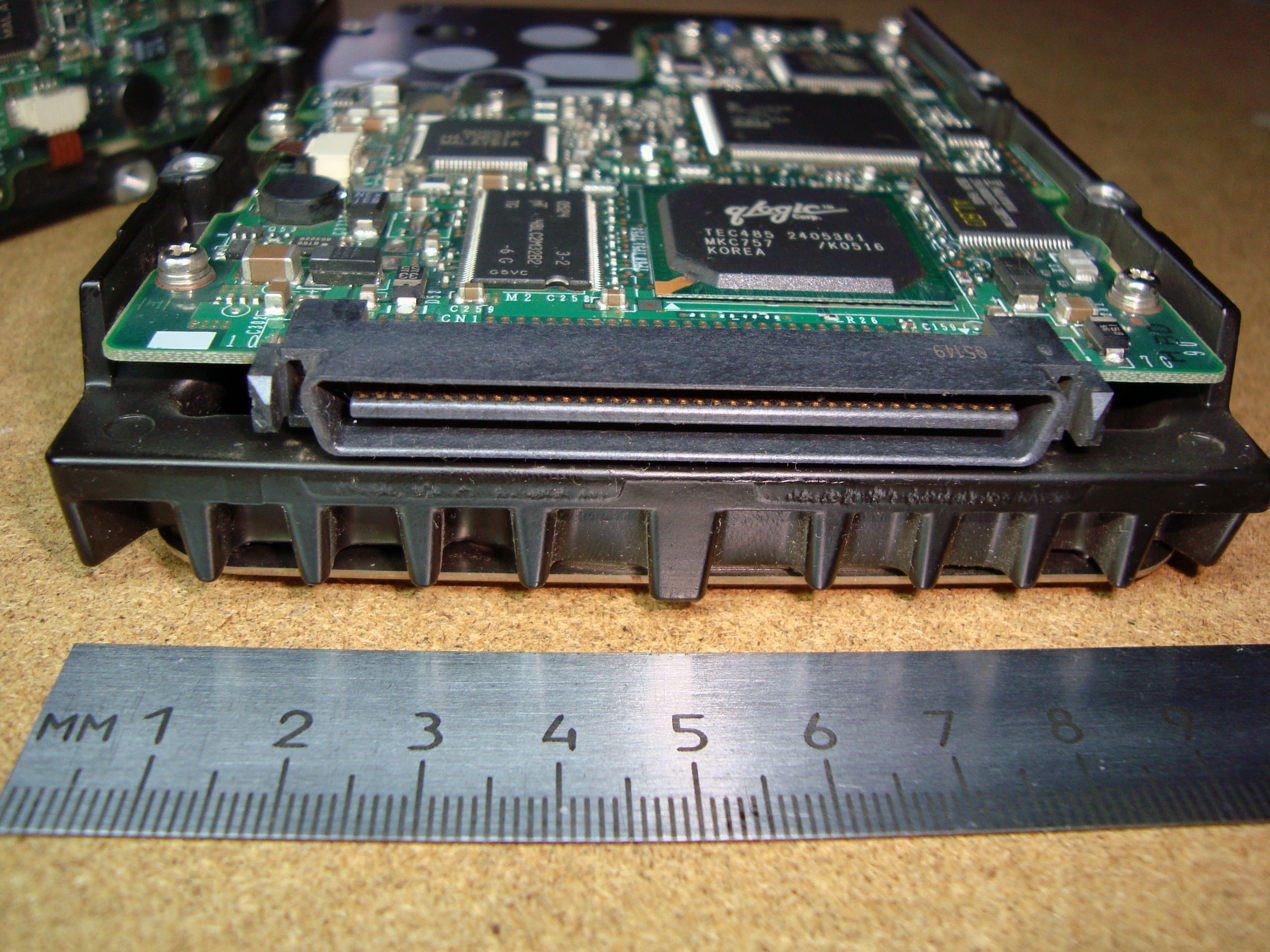
SCA-2 connector on Fujitsu MAP3735NC

As time went on, some manufacturers desired connectors even smaller than the SCSI-2 connector. One such in somewhat common use was the VHDCI (Very High Density Cable Interconnect) connector, also known as an AMP HPCN68M, and sometimes as SCSI-5. There are 68 pins on the connector in two rows; the pins are 0.8 mm apart. This connector is reputed to suffer fewer bent pins than the 68-pin SCSI-2 connector despite its minuscule pins.

==== Interoperability ====
There are adapters between most types of parallel SCSI connectors, and some companies will manufacture custom cables to guarantee having the correct connectors. An adapter from narrow to wide must include termination to work properly.

Different SCSI standards use the same SCSI connectors as in HVD (high-voltage differential) and LVD (low-voltage differential) SCSI. HVD uses 15 V while LVD uses 3.3 V, so connecting an HVD device to an LVD host bus adaptor can blow the line drivers on the HBA; likewise, an HVD HBA connected to an LVD device.

Similarly, connecting a single-ended device (SE) onto an LVD SCSI chain will cause the bus to fall back to single-ended mode, removing the ability to run faster than Ultra speed (20 MHz) and possibly causing an unstable bus for exceeding SE limits.

While interconnectivity of a number of devices may look straightforward, there are many pitfalls, and with older SE devices, the cabling length becomes an issue as signal degrades.

=== Drive caddies ===
Many manufacturers have devised systems in which a SCSI disk drive or other device was placed in a small caddy container (also called a drive sled), which carried connections for both power and data. The caddy or canister would be placed in a larger enclosure. Some of these systems allowed for hot swap (drives could be replaced with the system running), while others allowed warm swap, in which the SCSI bus was quiesced (meaning all drive activity was stopped) but remained powered on with devices ready.

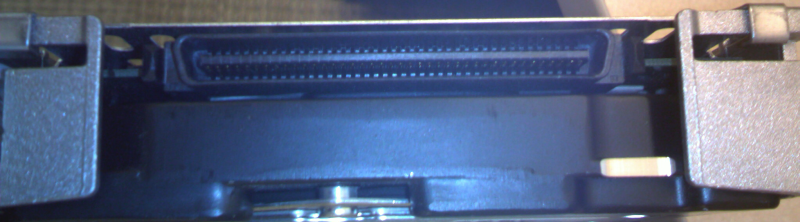
SCA 80 pin Connector – on hot-plug drive (HP/Compaq or DELL)

Digital Equipment Corporation's StorageWorks products were one system of this type. DEC briefly allowed third parties to license this system, but reversed the decision after less than a year; as a result, third-party StorageWorks products are quite rare. Compaq also made a drive caddy system for the Proliant line of servers. Compaq purchased DEC, and Hewlett-Packard later purchased Compaq, and the Proliant and StorageWorks names were reused on other storage products, including later hot-swap systems.

Some of these caddy systems were OEM manufactured, which means that the same product could appear with numerous brand names and model identifications. These Hot-Plug drives in caddies generally use 80 pin SCA connectors (HP, Compaq, DELL from SCSI-3 to Ultra-320)

=== Single Connector Attachment ===
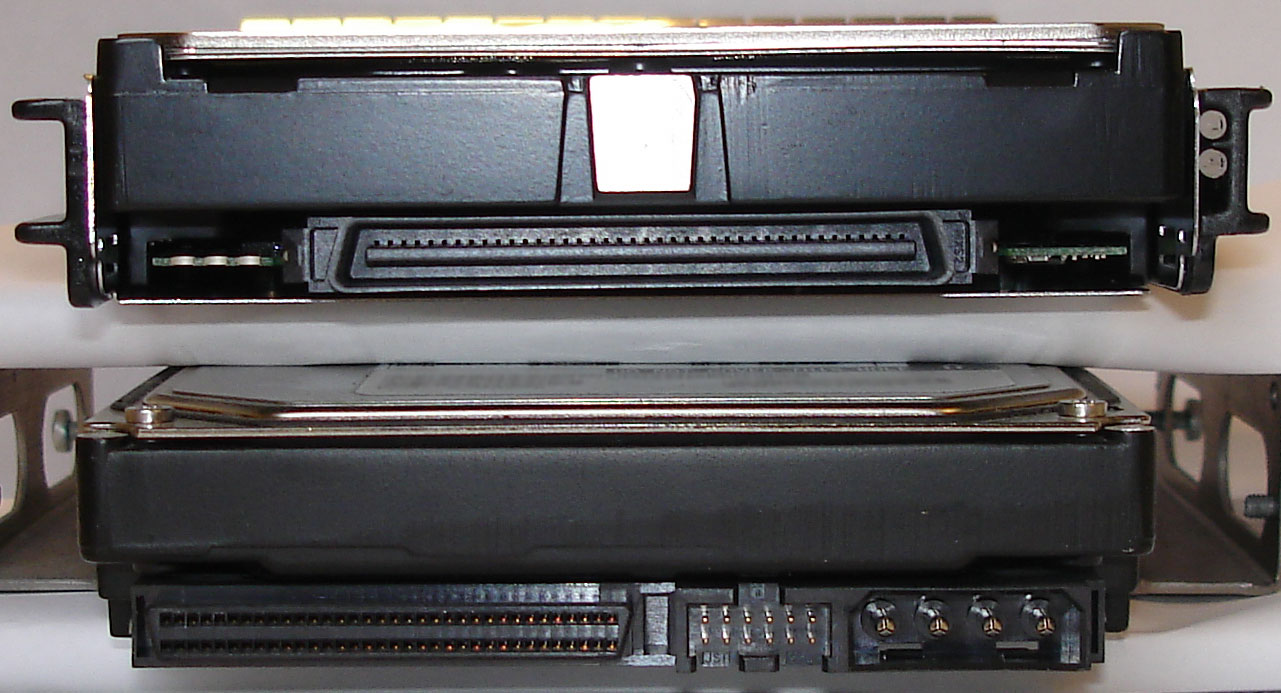
SCSI hard drives showing 80-pin SCA connector (top), and separate 68-pin and power connectors plus configuration jumpers (bottom)

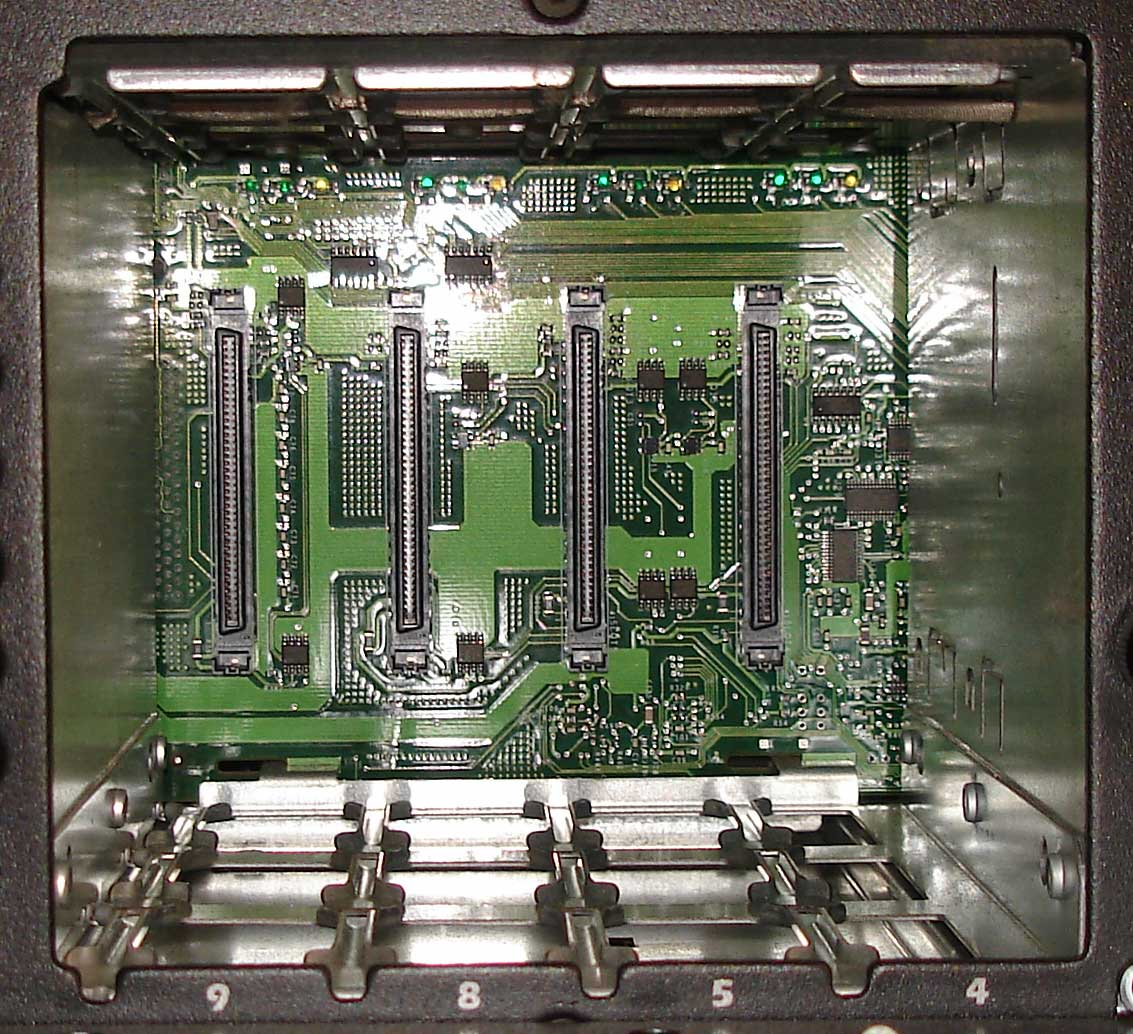
SCSI backplane with 80-pin SCA connectors. Hard drives are mounted on proprietary hot-swappable caddies.

Single Connector Attachment, or SCA, is a type of connection for the internal cabling of Parallel SCSI systems. There are two versions of this connector: the SCA-1, which is deprecated, and SCA-2, which is the most recent standard. In addition, there are Single-Ended (SE) and Low Voltage Differential (LVD) types of the SCA.

SCA is no longer in widespread use, having been superseded by Serial Attached SCSI (SAS).

Since hard disk drives are among the components of a server computer that are the most likely to fail, there has always been demand for the ability to replace a faulty drive without having to shut down the whole system. This technique is called hot-swapping and is one of the main motivations behind the development of SCA. In connection with RAID, for example, this allows for seamless replacement of failed drives.

Normally, hard disk drives make use of two cables: one for data and one for power, and they also have their specific parameters (SCSI ID, etc.) to be set using jumpers on each drive. Drives employing SCA have only one plug, which carries both data and power and also allows them to receive their configuration parameters from the SCSI backplane. The SCA connector for parallel SCSI drives has 80 pins, as opposed to the 68-pin interface found on most modern parallel SCSI drives.

Some of the pins in SCA connectors are longer than others, so they are connected first and disconnected last. This ensures the electrical integrity of the whole system. Otherwise, the angle at which the plug is inserted into the drive could be the reason for damage because, for instance, the pin carrying the voltage could get connected before its corresponding ground reference pin. The additional length also provides what is known as a pre-charge which provides a means whereby the device is alerted to a pending power surge. That allows a slower transition to full power and thereby makes the device more stable.

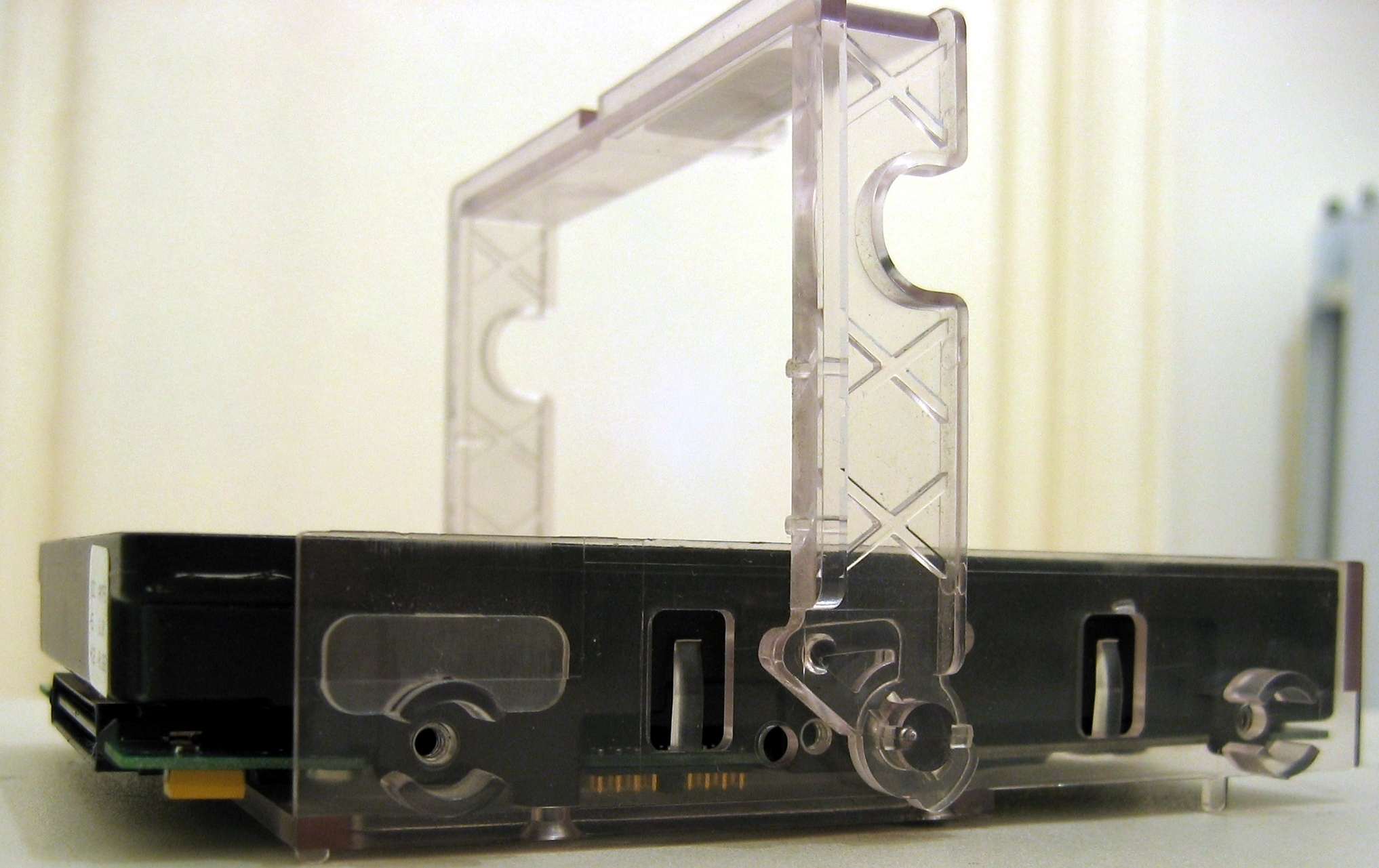
SPARCstation 20 drive in cradle

To make better use of their hot-plugging capability, SCA drives are usually installed into drive bays into which they slide with ease. At the far end of these bays is the backplane of the SCSI subsystem, located with a connector that plugs into the drive automatically when it is inserted.

Full hot-swappable functionality still requires the support of other software and hardware components of the system. In particular, the operating system and RAID layers will need hot-swap support to enable hard drive hot-swapping to be carried out without shutting down the system.

== Serial SCSI ==
Serial SCSI disk drives use smaller connectors due to the reduced number of signals required. There are three types of physical layer transports specified:

- Fibre Channel, also called FC
- SAS, Serial Attached SCSI
- SSA, the Serial Storage Architecture

Additionally, there is the iSCSI transport, which is not present on the drives themselves, but is used to connect devices using TCP/IP networks. The drives themselves would use one of the other three connector types.

=== Connectors on internal drives ===
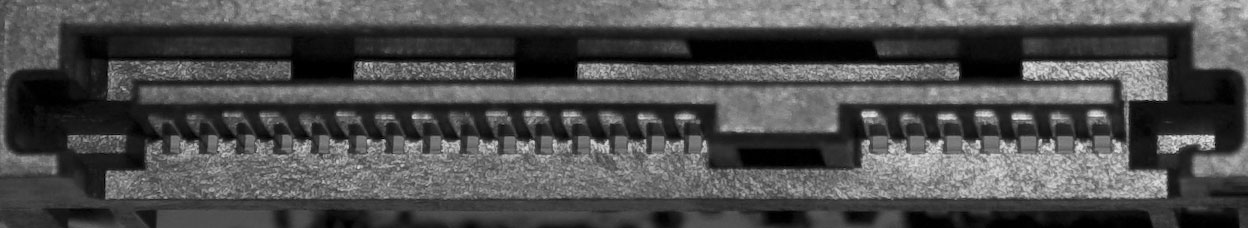
Internal SFF-8482 connector on a SAS HDD

- Fibre Channel FC-AL disk-drives include a 40-pin SCA-2 connector
- SSA disk drives include a unitized composite connector
- SAS disk drives have an SFF-8482 connector. This is form factor compatible with the connector on SATA disk drives, meaning that a SATA drive may be installed in an SAS drive bay, and the enclosure can use the Serial ATA Tunneling Protocol (STP) to make use of the drive. There are keyed parts to the connector on an SAS drive that will prevent it from being inserted into a SATA drive bay.
- iSCSI isn't used for connecting disk drives internally

=== External connectors ===
- Fibre Channel
  - FC-AL cables initially used DE-9 connectors (electrical) or SC connectors (optical)
  - More recent FC-AL cables use HSSDC connectors (electrical) or LC connectors (optical).
  - Many FC-AL products now use an intermediate device called a GBIC (GigaBit Interface Converter) which allows more flexibility. GBICs can interconnect with a range of Small Form-factor Pluggable (SFP) connectors.
- SAS interconnections use either
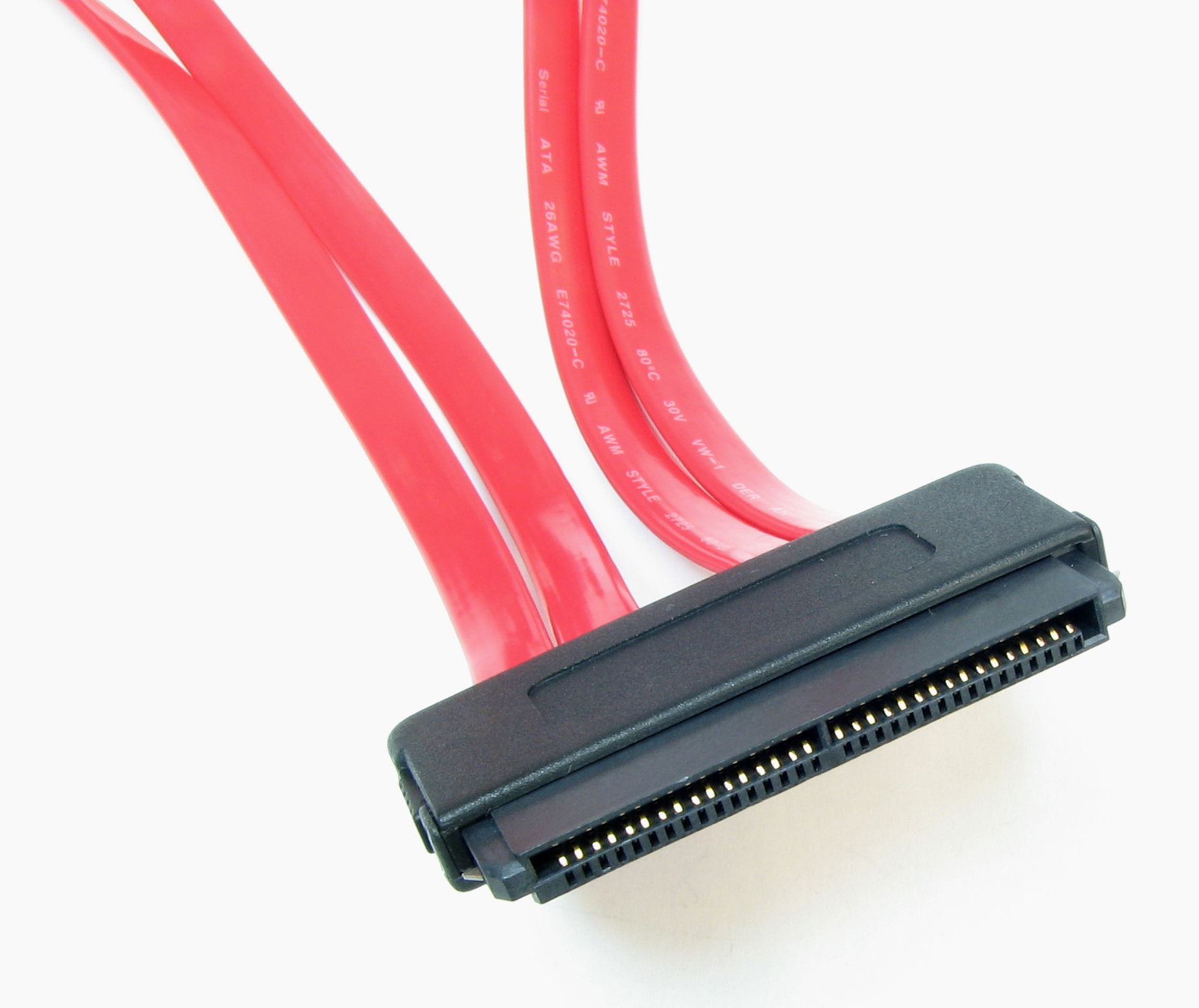
  An SFF-8484 connector on a cable
  - SFF-8484 multilane unshielded serial attachment connector (internal connector)
  - SFF-8470 multilane copper connector, also known as an Infiniband connector (external connector)
  - SFF-8087 Molex iPASS unshielded mini-multilane, reduced width internal connector
  - SFF-8088 Molex iPASS shielded mini-multilane, reduced width external connector
- SSA cables are terminated with 9-pin micro-D connectors
- iSCSI may be interconnected by any means used to build a TCP/IP network, since the SCSI commands are simply being carried over TCP/IP. Ethernet is the predominantly used physical layer.

=== Drive caddies ===
The situation is fundamentally similar to that of Parallel SCSI drive caddies; there have been a range of manufacturers, and the caddies themselves contain a generic device (with one of the standard internal connectors) which can be removed and replaced.

== See also ==
- Fibre Channel electrical interface, for details of the SCA-40 connector
- SAF-TE - active backplanes for sensoring and swap assistance
