= Tryzuby Stas =

Ukrainian musician (1948–2007)

Tryzuby Stas Тризубий Стас
- Born: Stanislav Shcherbatykh; 24 February 1948; Aleysk, Altai Krai, (RSFSR)
- Died: 24 January 2007 (aged 58) Kyiv, Ukraine
- Genres: Folk; pop; bard music
- Occupations: Musician; composer; poet
- Instrument: Guitar
- Years active: 1991–2007

Stanislav Ivanovych Shcherbatykh (Ukrainian: Станіслав Іванович Щербатих, Russian: Станислав Иванович Щербатых) (24 February 1948 – 24 January 2007), better known by his stage name Tryzuby Stas (Ukrainian: Тризубий Стас, romanized: Tryzubyi Stas, "Trident Stas"), was a Ukrainian musician and author of Ukrainian anti-communist political satire.

== Biography ==
Shcherbatykh was born in Altai, in the town of Aleysk. His father was Russian and his mother Ukrainian. After his father was killed, the Shcherbatykh family moved to Stanislaviv, Ukrainian SSR, in the summer of 1949. Shcherbatykh graduated from a Russian-speaking school.

In 1976, Shcherbatykh married the Kyivan poet Maria Huk. In 1977, they traveled to Kamchatka, where Maria gave birth to a son, Volodymyr. In 1980, the family returned to Ukraine. There, Shcherbatykh worked in the film industry. At the end of the decade, he joined the theatrical studio Ne zhurysya! in Lviv. Around this time, he adopted the stage name "Tryzuby Stas" (Trident Stas). He humorously explained that it represented the "three teeth" he had: (Note: To have teeth for something is a play-on-words meaning to have a grudge against something.) the Komsomol, the Communist party, and trade unions. At the beginning of the 1990s, Shcherbatykh began writing songs that were critical of the government.

Shcherbatykh died on 24 January 2007 in his Kyiv apartment, from a heart attack.
