= Stash =

Stash may refer to:

== Businesses ==
- Stash Hotel Rewards
- Stash Tea Company

== Computing and technology ==
- BitBucket, formerly Stash (software), Git repository management service
- Symbol Table hASH, in Perl programming language

== Music ==
- Stash (band), a Belgian music band
- Stash Records, a defunct American independent jazz record label
- Stash (Bongzilla album), 1999
- Stash (Phish album), 1996
- Stash (EP), a 2002 EP by Cypress Hill
- "Stash" (song), on Tyga's album Legendary

== People ==
- Mamyr Stash (born 1993), Russian racing cyclist
- Stash (graffiti artist), American artist Josh Franklin (born 1967)
- Major Stash, a ring name of American retired professional wrestler Mark Hildreth (born 1967)

== Other uses ==
- Stash: No Loot Left Behind, a role-playing video game released in 2017

== See also ==
- Stach (disambiguation)
- Stache, a short form of moustache
