= Diode-or circuit =

A diode-OR circuit is used in electronics to isolate two or more voltage sources. There are two typical implementations:

When a DC supply voltage needs to be generated from one of a number of different sources, for example when terminating a parallel SCSI bus, a very simple circuit like this can be used:

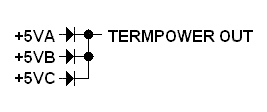

In digital electronics a diode-OR circuit is used to derive a simple Boolean logic function. This kind of circuit was once very common in diode–transistor logic but has been largely replaced by CMOS in modern electronics:

== See also ==
- Diode logic
