= STA =

STA or Sta may refer to:

== Organizations ==
- Samoa Tourism Authority
- Science & Technology Australia, a peak body for scientists and technologists
- Scottish Tartans Authority
- Scottish Trans Alliance
- Spokane Transit Authority, US
- State Transit Authority, a former government agency of New South Wales, Australia
- State Transport Authority (South Australia), a former government agency
- State Transport Authority (Victoria), a former Victorian government-owned corporation, Australia
- STA Travel, a former travel agency for young people
- Slovenska tiskovna agencija, Slovenian Press Agency
- Student Transportation of America

=== Schools ===
- Saint Thomas Academy, Minnesota, US
- St. Theresita's Academy, Silay City, Philippines
- Shanghai Theatre Academy, Shanghai, China
- St. Thomas Aquinas High School (Louisville), Ohio, US
- St. Thomas Aquinas Catholic Secondary School (London, Ontario), Canada
- St. Albans School (Washington, D.C.), US

== Science and technology ==
- Science & Technology Australia, a peak body for scientists and technologists
- Shortcuts to adiabaticity, fast routes to results from slow, adiabatic changes of a quantum system's controlling parameters
- Spacetime algebra, in mathematical physics
- Spike-triggered average, a tool for characterizing the response properties of a neuron
- Special temporary authority, to operate a radio station in the US
- Static timing analysis, of a digital circuit
- Station (computer networking), in IEEE 802.11 (Wi-Fi) terminology
- Simultaneous thermal analysis, in thermal analysis
- Single-Threaded Apartment, in Component Object Model

== Military and space ==
- Shuttle Training Aircraft, a NASA training vehicle
- Surveillance and Target Acquisition, a military role
  - STA platoon, up to the first Gulf War
  - STA sniper, after the first Gulf War

== Other uses ==
- SCSI Trade Association, STA or SCSITA
- Stauning Vestjylland Airport (IATA code), Denmark
- Sustainable Transport Award, to a city
- Satna Junction railway station, India (station code: STA)

== See also ==
- Structural Test Article, for example Space Shuttle Challenger STA-099
- STA-21 or Seaman to Admiral - 21, U.S. Navy commissioning program
