= Serial Attached SCSI =

Point-to-point serial protocol for enterprise storage

SAS
- Serial Attached SCSI
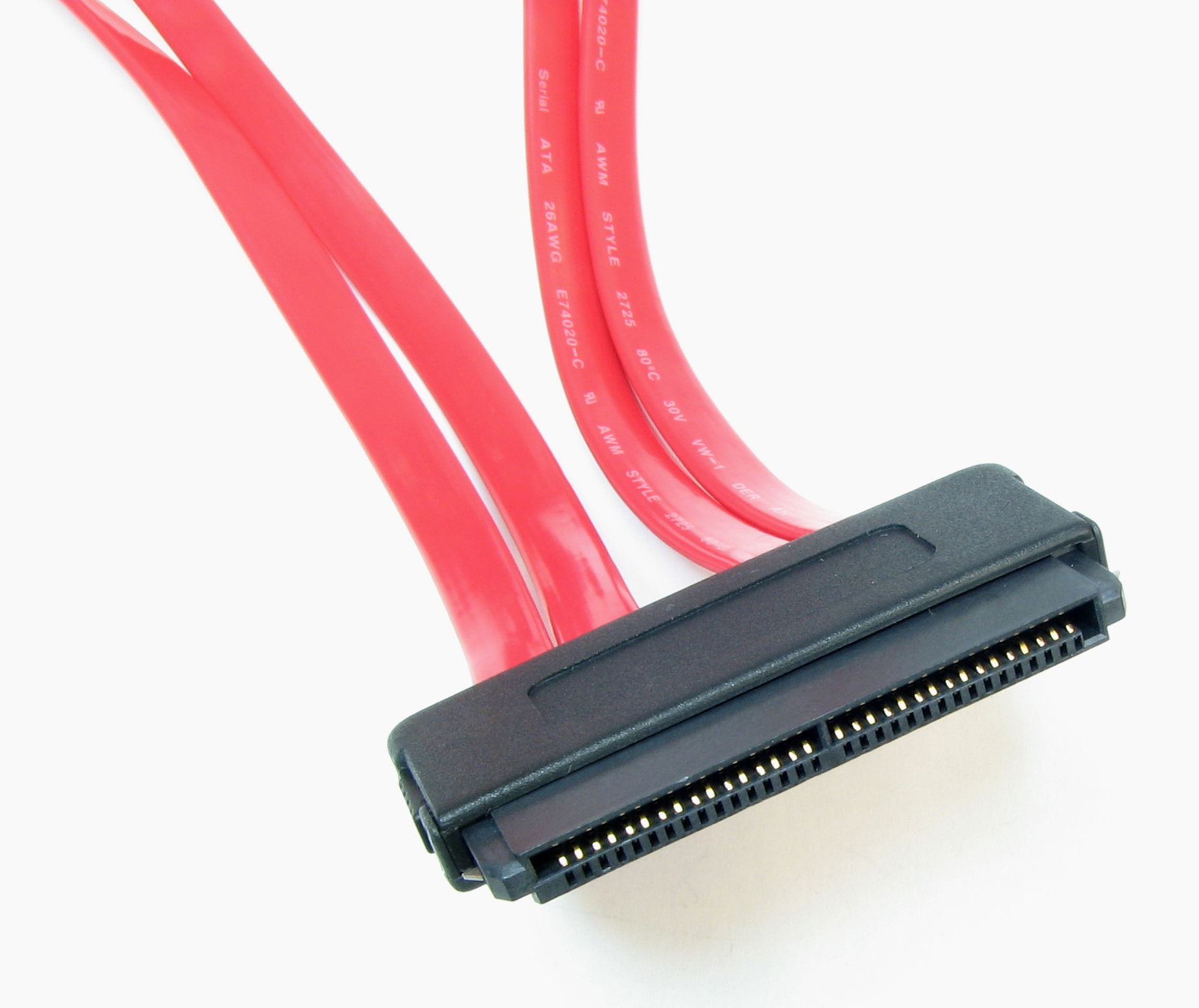
- SAS connector
- Width in bits: 1
- No. of devices: 65,535
- Speed: SAS-1: 3 Gbit/s Full-duplex (2004); SAS-2: 6 Gbit/s Full-duplex (2010); SAS-3: 12 Gbit/s Full-duplex (2014); SAS-4: 22.5 Gbit/s Full-duplex (2019)
- Style: Serial
- Hotplugging interface: Yes

In computing, Serial Attached SCSI (SAS) is a point-to-point serial protocol that moves data to and from computer-storage devices such as hard disk drives, solid-state drives and tape drives. SAS replaces the older Parallel SCSI (Parallel Small Computer System Interface, usually pronounced "scuzzy") bus technology that first appeared in the mid-1980s. SAS, like its predecessor, uses the standard SCSI command set. SAS offers optional compatibility with Serial ATA (SATA), versions 2 and later. This allows the connection of SATA drives to most SAS backplanes or controllers. The reverse, connecting SAS drives to SATA backplanes, is not possible.

The T10 technical committee of the International Committee for Information Technology Standards (INCITS) develops and maintains the SAS protocol; the SCSI Trade Association (SCSITA) promotes the technology.

== Introduction ==
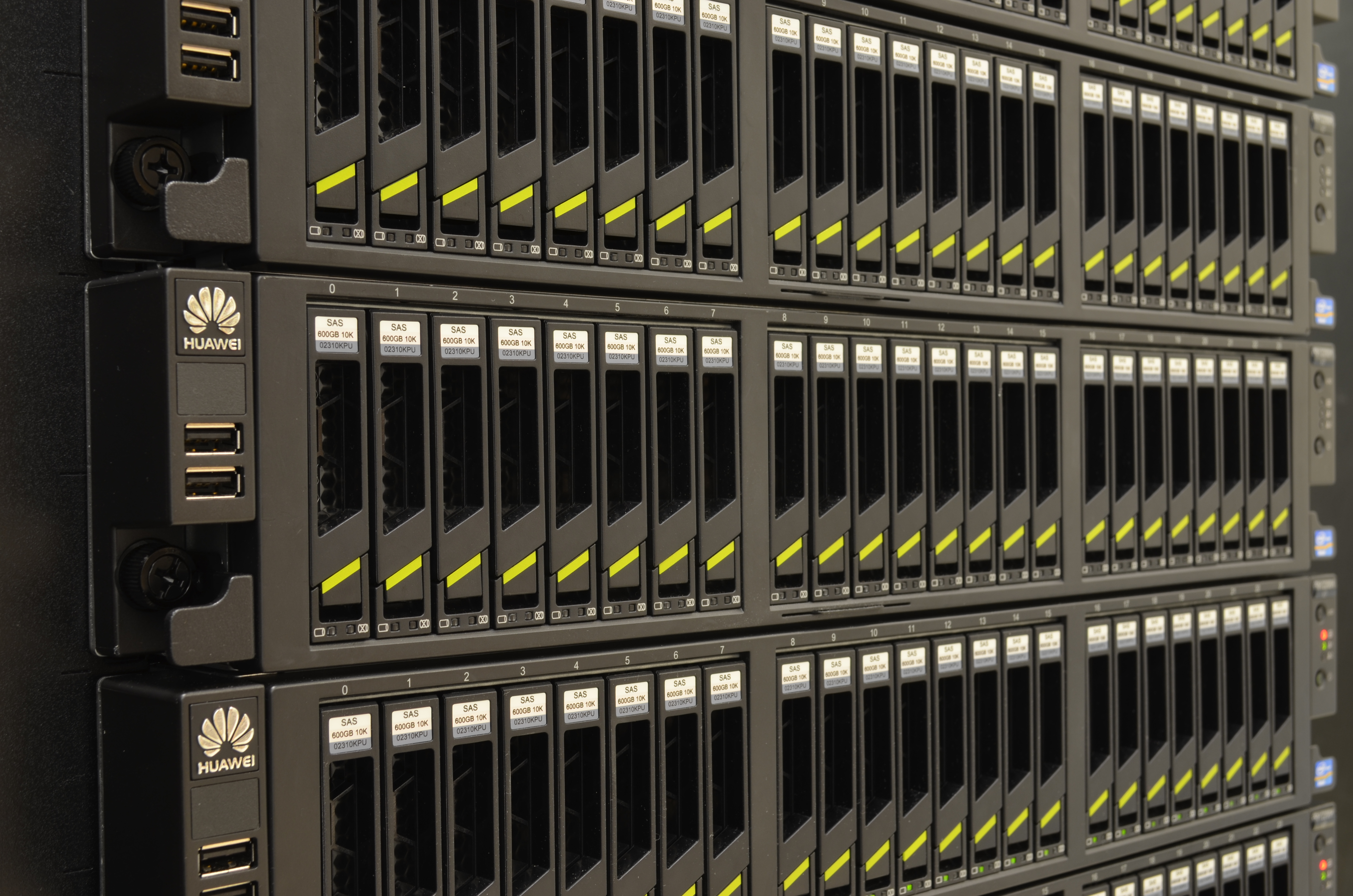
Storage servers housing 24 SAS hard disk drives per server

A typical Serial Attached SCSI system consists of the following basic components:

1. An initiator: a device that originates device-service and task-management requests for processing by a target device and receives responses for the same requests from other target devices. Initiators may be provided as an on-board component on the motherboard (as is the case with many server-oriented motherboards) or as an add-on host bus adapter.
2. A target: a device containing logical units and target ports that receives device service and task management requests for processing and sends responses for the same requests to initiator devices. A target device could be a hard disk drive or a disk array system.
3. A service delivery subsystem: the part of an I/O system that transmits information between an initiator and a target. Typically cables connecting an initiator and target with or without expanders and backplanes constitute a service delivery subsystem.
4. Expanders: devices that form part of a service delivery subsystem and facilitate communication between SAS devices. Expanders facilitate the connection of multiple SAS End devices to a single initiator port.

== History ==
- SAS-1: 3.0 Gbit/s, standard approved in 2004
  - SAS-1.1: standard approved in 2006
- SAS-2: 6.0 Gbit/s, standard approved in 2010
  - SAS-2.1: standard approved in 2011
- SAS-3: 12.0 Gbit/s, standard approved in 2014
- SAS-4: 22.5 Gbit/s (called "24G"), standard approved in 2019
  - SAS-4.1: (called "24G+") standard approved in 2023
- SAS-5-draft: Enhancements to SAS-4 with additional connector definitions to align with new form factors and to improve signal integrity, development started in May 2018

== Identification and addressing ==
A SAS Domain is the SAS version of a SCSI domain—it consists of a set of SAS devices that communicate with one another by means of a service delivery subsystem. Each SAS port in a SAS domain has a SCSI port identifier that identifies the port uniquely within the SAS domain, the World Wide Name. It is assigned by the device manufacturer, like an Ethernet device's MAC address, and is typically worldwide unique as well. SAS devices use these port identifiers to address communications to each other.

In addition, every SAS device has a SCSI device name, which identifies the SAS device uniquely in the world. One does not often see these device names because the port identifiers tend to identify the device sufficiently.

For comparison, in parallel SCSI, the SCSI ID is the port identifier and device name. In Fibre Channel, the port identifier is a WWPN and the device name is a WWNN.

In SAS, both SCSI port identifiers and SCSI device names take the form of a SAS address, which is a 64 bit value, normally in the NAA IEEE Registered format. People sometimes refer to a SCSI port identifier as the SAS address of a device, out of confusion. People sometimes call a SAS address a World Wide Name or WWN, because it is essentially the same thing as a WWN in Fibre Channel. For a SAS expander device, the SCSI port identifier and SCSI device name are the same SAS address.

== Nearline SAS ==
Nearline SAS (abbreviated to NL-SAS, and sometimes called midline SAS) drives have a SAS interface, but head, media, and rotational speed of traditional enterprise-class SATA drives, so they cost less than other SAS drives. When compared to SATA, NL-SAS drives have the following benefits:

- Dual ports allowing redundant paths
- Ability to connect a device to multiple computers
- Full SCSI command set
- No need for using Serial ATA Tunneling Protocol (STP), which is necessary for SATA HDDs to be connected to a SAS HBA.
- No need for SATA interposer cards, which are needed for pseudo–dual-port high availability of SATA HDDs.
- Larger depth of command queues

== Comparison with parallel SCSI ==
- The SAS "bus" operates point-to-point while the SCSI bus is multidrop. Each SAS device is connected by a dedicated link to the initiator, unless an expander is used. If one initiator is connected to one target, there is no opportunity for contention; with parallel SCSI, even this situation could cause contention.
- SAS has no termination issues and does not require terminator packs like parallel SCSI.
- SAS eliminates clock skew.
- SAS allows up to 65,535 devices through the use of expanders, while Parallel SCSI has a limit of 8 or 16 devices on a single channel.
- SAS allows a higher transfer speed (SAS-1, SAS-2, SAS-3, and SAS-4 supports data bandwidth of 3, 6, 12, and 24 Gbits/sec, respectively) than most parallel SCSI standards. SAS achieves these speeds on each initiator-target connection, hence getting higher throughput, whereas parallel SCSI shares the speed across the entire multidrop bus.
- SAS devices feature dual ports, allowing for redundant backplanes or multipath I/O; this feature is usually referred to as the dual-domain SAS.
- SAS controllers may connect to SATA devices, either directly connected using native SATA protocol or through SAS expanders using Serial ATA Tunneling Protocol (STP).
- Both SAS and parallel SCSI use the SCSI command set.

== Comparison with SATA ==
There is little physical difference between SAS and SATA.

- SAS protocol provides for multiple initiators in a SAS domain, while SATA has no analogous provision.
- Most SAS drives provide tagged command queuing, while most newer SATA drives provide native command queuing.
- SATA uses a command set that is based on the parallel ATA command set and then extended beyond that set to include features like native command queuing, hot-plugging, and TRIM. SAS uses the SCSI command set, which includes a wider range of features like error recovery, reservations and block reclamation. Basic ATA has commands only for direct-access storage. However SCSI commands may be tunneled through ATAPI for devices such as CD/DVD drives.
- SAS hardware allows multipath I/O to devices while SATA (prior to SATA 2.0) does not. Per specification, SATA 2.0 makes use of port multipliers to achieve port expansion, and some port multiplier manufacturers have implemented multipath I/O using port multiplier hardware.
- SATA is marketed as a general-purpose successor to parallel ATA and has become common in the consumer market, whereas the more-expensive SAS targets critical server applications.
- SAS error-recovery and error-reporting uses SCSI commands, which have more functionality than the ATA SMART commands used by SATA drives.
- SAS uses higher signaling voltages (800–1,600 mV for transmit, and 275–1,600 mV for receive) than SATA (400–600 mV for transmit, and 325–600 mV for receive). The higher voltage offers (among other features) the ability to use SAS in server backplanes.
- Because of its higher signaling voltages, SAS can use cables up to 10 m (33 ft) long, whereas SATA has a cable-length limit of 1 m (3.3 ft) or 2 m (6.6 ft) for eSATA.
- SAS is full duplex, whereas SATA is half duplex. The SAS transport layer can transmit data at the full speed of the link in both directions at once, so a SCSI command executing over the link can transfer data to and from the device simultaneously. However, because SCSI commands that can do that are rare, and a SAS link must be dedicated to an individual command at a time, this is generally not an advantage with a single device.

== Characteristics ==
=== Technical details ===
The Serial Attached SCSI standard defines several layers (in order from highest to lowest): application, transport, port, link, PHY and physical. Serial Attached SCSI comprises three transport protocols:

- Serial SCSI Protocol (SSP) – for command-level communication with SCSI devices.
- Serial ATA Tunneling Protocol (STP) – for command-level communication with SATA devices.
- Serial Management Protocol (SMP) – for managing the SAS fabric.

For the Link and PHY layers, SAS defines its own unique protocol.

At the physical layer, the SAS standard defines connectors and voltage levels. The physical characteristics of the SAS wiring and signaling are compatible with and have loosely tracked that of SATA up to the 6 Gbit/s rate, although SAS defines more rigorous physical signaling specifications as well as a wider allowable differential voltage swing intended to allow longer cabling. While SAS-1.0 and SAS-1.1 adopted the physical signaling characteristics of SATA at the 3 Gbit/s rate with 8b/10b encoding, SAS-2.0 development of a 6 Gbit/s physical rate led the development of an equivalent SATA speed. In 2013, 12 Gbit/s followed in the SAS-3 specification. SAS-4 is slated to introduce 22.5 Gbit/s signaling with a more efficient 128b/150b encoding scheme to realize a usable data rate of 2,400 MB/s while retaining compatibility with 6 and 12 Gbit/s.

Additionally, SCSI Express takes advantage of the PCI Express infrastructure to directly connect SCSI devices over a more universal interface.

=== Architecture ===
The architecture of SAS layers

SAS architecture consists of six layers:

- Physical layer:
  - defines electrical and physical characteristics
  - differential signaling transmission
  - Multiple connector types:
    - SFF-8482 – SATA compatible
    - Internal four-lane connectors: SFF-8484, SFF-8087, SFF-8643
    - External four-lane connectors: SFF-8470, SFF-8088, SFF-8644
- PHY Layer:
  - 8b/10b data encoding (3, 6, and 12 Gbit/s)
  - 128b/150b SPL packet encoding (22.5 Gbit/s) (2 bit header, 128 bit payload, 20 bit Reed-Solomon forward error correction)
  - Link initialization, speed negotiation and reset sequences
  - Link capabilities negotiation (SAS-2 onwards)
- Link layer:
  - Insertion and deletion of primitives for clock-speed disparity matching
  - Primitive encoding
  - Data scrambling for reduced EMI
  - Establish and tear down native connections between SAS targets and initiators
  - Establish and tear down tunneled connections between SAS initiators and SATA targets connected to SAS expanders
  - Power management (proposed for SAS-2.1)
- Port layer:
  - Combining multiple PHYs with the same addresses into wide ports
- Transport layer:
  - Contains three transport protocols:
    - Serial SCSI Protocol (SSP): for command-level communication with SCSI devices
    - Serial ATA Tunneled Protocol (STP): for command-level communication with SATA devices
    - Serial Management Protocol (SMP): for managing the SAS fabric
- Application layer

=== Topology ===
An initiator may connect directly to a target via one or more PHYs (such a connection is called a port whether it uses one or more PHYs, although the term wide port is sometimes used for a multi-PHY connection).

=== SAS expanders ===
The components known as Serial Attached SCSI Expanders (SAS Expanders) facilitate communication between large numbers of SAS devices. Expanders contain two or more external expander-ports. Each expander device contains at least one SAS Management Protocol target port for management and may contain SAS devices itself. For example, an expander may include a Serial SCSI Protocol target port for access to a peripheral device. An expander is not necessary to interface a SAS initiator and target but allows a single initiator to communicate with more SAS/SATA targets. A useful analogy: one can regard an expander as akin to a network switch in a network, which connects multiple systems using a single switch port.

SAS 1 defined two types of expander; however, the SAS-2.0 standard has dropped the distinction between the two, as it created unnecessary topological limitations with no realized benefit:

- An edge expander allows for communication with up to 255 SAS addresses, allowing the SAS initiator to communicate with these additional devices. Edge expanders can do direct table routing and subtractive routing. (For a brief discussion of these routing mechanisms, see below). Without a fanout expander, you can use at most two edge expanders in a delivery subsystem (because you connect the subtractive routing port of those edge expanders together, and you can not connect any more expanders). Fanout expanders solve this bottleneck.
- A fanout expander can connect up to 255 sets of edge expanders, known as an edge expander device set, letting even more SAS devices be addressed. The subtractive routing port of each edge expanders connects to the phys of fanout expander. A fanout expander cannot do subtractive routing, it can only forward subtractive routing requests to the connected edge expanders.

Direct routing allows a device to identify devices directly connected to it. Table routing identifies devices connected to the expanders connected to a device's own PHY. Subtractive routing is used when you are not able to find the devices in the sub-branch you belong to. This passes the request to a different branch altogether.

Expanders exist to allow more complex interconnect topologies. Expanders assist in link-switching (as opposed to packet-switching) end-devices (initiators or targets). They may locate an end-device either directly (when the end-device is connected to it), via a routing table (a mapping of end-device IDs and the expander the link should be switched to downstream to route towards that ID), or when those methods fail, via subtractive routing: the link is routed to a single expander connected to a subtractive routing port. If there is no expander connected to a subtractive port, the end-device cannot be reached.

Expanders with no PHYs configured as subtractive act as fanout expanders and can connect to any number of other expanders. Expanders with subtractive PHYs may only connect to two other expanders at a maximum, and in that case they must connect to one expander via a subtractive port and the other via a non-subtractive port.

SAS-1.1 topologies built with expanders generally contain one root node in a SAS domain with the one exception case being topologies that contain two expanders connected via a subtractive-to-subtractive port. If it exists, the root node is the expander, which is not connected to another expander via a subtractive port. Therefore, if a fanout expander exists in the configuration, it must be the domain's root node. The root node contains routes for all end devices connected to the domain. Note that with the advent in SAS-2.0 of table-to-table routing and new rules for end-to-end zoning, more complex topologies built upon SAS-2.0 rules do not contain a single root node.

=== Connectors ===
SAS connectors are much smaller than traditional parallel SCSI connectors. Commonly, SAS-3 provides for point data transfer speeds up to 12 Gbit/s. Currently, SAS-4 is available with up to 24 Gbps; with SAS-5 under development, according to T10.

The physical SAS connector comes in several different variants:

Code- name	other names	external/ internal	Pins	No of devices / lanes	Comment	Image
SFF-8086	Internal mini-SAS, internal mSAS	internal	26	4 devices 4 lanes	This is a less common implementation of internal mSAS than SFF-8087's 36-circuit version. The fewer positions is enabled by it not supporting sidebands.	
SFF-8087	Internal mini-SAS, internal mSAS, internal iSAS, internal iPass	internal	36	4 devices 4 lanes	Unshielded 36-circuit implementation of SFF-8086. Molex iPass reduced width internal 4× connector; 12 Gbit/s capability.	
SFF-8088	External mini-SAS, external mSAS, external iSAS, external iPass	external	26	4 devices 4 lanes	Shielded 26-circuit implementation of SFF-8086. Molex iPass reduced width external 4× connector; 12 Gbit/s capability.	
SFF-8431	SFP+	external	20	1 device 1 lane		
SFF-8436	QSFP+, Quad SFP+	external	38	1 device 4 lanes	Commonly used with many NetApp storage systems. Often seen with SFF-8088 or SFF-8644 on the other end; 6 Gbit/s capability.	
SFF-8470	InfiniBand CX4 connector, Molex LaneLink	external	34	4 devices 4 lanes	High-density external connector (also used as an internal connector).	
SFF-8482		internal	29	1 device 1 lane	This form factor is designed for compatibility with SATA but can drive a SAS device. A SAS controller can control SATA drives, but a SATA controller cannot control SAS drives. Lower pins (S1-S7, P1-P11) defined as in SATA. Upper pins S8-S14 provide additional lane of data. The most common connection for SAS drives connecting to backplanes in servers, i.e. PowerEdge and ProLiant	
SFF-8484		internal	32 or 19	4 devices 4 lanes	High-density internal connector, 2 and 4 lane versions are defined by the SFF standard.	
SFF-8485					Defines SGPIO (extension of SFF 8484), a serial link protocol used usually for LED indicators.	
SFF-8613 (SFF-8643)	Mini-SAS HD, U.2 internal	internal	36	1 device 4 lanes	Mini-SAS HD (introduced with SAS 12 Gbit/s) Also known as a U.2 port along with SFF-8639.	
SFF-8614 (SFF-8644)	external Mini-SAS HD	external		1 device 4 lanes	Mini-SAS HD (introduced with SAS 12 Gbit/s)	
Sideband connector		internal			Often seen with 1× SFF-8643 or 1× SFF-8087 on the other end – internal fan-out for 4× SATA drives. Connects the controller to drives without backplane or to the (SATA) backplane and optionally, to the status LEDs.	
SFF-8680		internal		1; (2 ports)	SAS 12 Gbit/s backplane connector; same pinout as SFF-8482, but with electrical requirements for 12 Gbit/s; SFF-8678 is analogously defined for 6 Gbit/s.	
SFF-8639	U.2 Also used for SATA Express and U.3 (SFF-TA-1001).	internal	68	1 device 4 lanes	SAS 12 Gbit/s backplane connector; downward-compatible with SFF-8680.	
SFF-8638					Four 1x ports at up to 24 Gb/s each; two 2x ports at up to 48 Gb/s each; one 4x port at up to 96 Gb/s.	
SFF-8640					Four 1x ports at up to 24 Gb/s each; two 2x ports at up to 48 Gb/s each; one 4x port at up to 96 Gb/s.	
SFF-8681					Two 1x ports at up to 24 Gb/s each; one 2x ports at up to 48 Gb/s each.	
SFF-8654	SlimSAS	internal	4X: 38 8X: 74	1 device 4 lanes	4X and 8X SAS-4 plug and receptacle	

== See also ==
- List of device bandwidths
- SCSI / ATA Translation
- Serial Storage Architecture
- USB Attached SCSI
