= Fibre Channel electrical interface =

Information transmission standard

The Fibre Channel electrical interface is one of two related Fibre Channel standards that can be used to physically interconnect computer devices. The other standard is a Fibre Channel optical interface, which is not covered in this article.

== Signal characteristics ==
Fibre channel electrical signals are sent over a duplex differential interface. This usually consists of twisted-pair cables with a nominal impedance of 75 ohms (single-ended) or 150 ohms (differential). This is a genuine differential signalling system so no ground reference is carried through the cable, except for the shield. Signalling is AC-coupled, with the series capacitors located at the transmitter end of the link.

The definition of the Fibre Channel signalling voltage is complex. Eye-diagrams are defined for both the transmitter and receiver. There are many eye-diagram parameters that must all be met to be compliant with the standard. In simple terms, the transmitter circuit must output a signal with a minimum of 600 mV peak-to-peak differential, maximum 2000 mV peak-to-peak differential. A good signal looks rather like a sine-wave with a fundamental frequency of half the data rate, so 1 GHz for a typical system running at 2 gigabits per second.

The Bit-Error Rate (BER) objective for Fibre Channel systems is 1 in 10^{12} (1 bit in 1,000,000,000,000 bits). At 2 Gbit/s this equates to seven errors per hour. Therefore, this is a common event and the receiver circuitry must contain error-handling logic. In order to achieve such a low error-rate, jitter "budgets" are defined for the transmitter and cables.

== Connector pinouts ==
There are various Fibre Channel connectors in use in the computer industry. Details of their pinouts are distributed between different official documents. The following sections describe the most common Fibre Channel pinouts with some comments about the purpose of their electrical signals.

The most familiar Fibre Channel connectors are cable connectors, used for interconnects between initiators and targets (usually disk enclosures). There are also "device connectors" that can be found on Fibre Channel disk-drives and backplanes of enclosures. The device connectors include pins for power and for setting disk options.

== DE-9 cable connector ==
Pin	Signal name	Comments
1	+OUT	Fibre channel output
2	+5V	Optional
3	Module Fault Detect	Optional
4	Reserved	
5	+IN	Fibre channel input
6	-OUT	Fibre channel output
7	Output Disable	Optional
8	GND	Optional, return for pin 2
9	-IN	Fibre channel input

Optional pins 2, 3, 7, and 8 are intended for use with an external optical converter. This is often called a Media Interface Assembly (MIA).

Fibre channel DE-9 connectors often have only the 4 required contacts installed. Note that they are the four outermost contacts, i.e., the same as used for Token Ring, this is an easy way to tell a fibre channel cable from an RS-232 cable.

== HSSDC cable connector ==
8-pin High Speed Serial Data Connection (HSSDC)

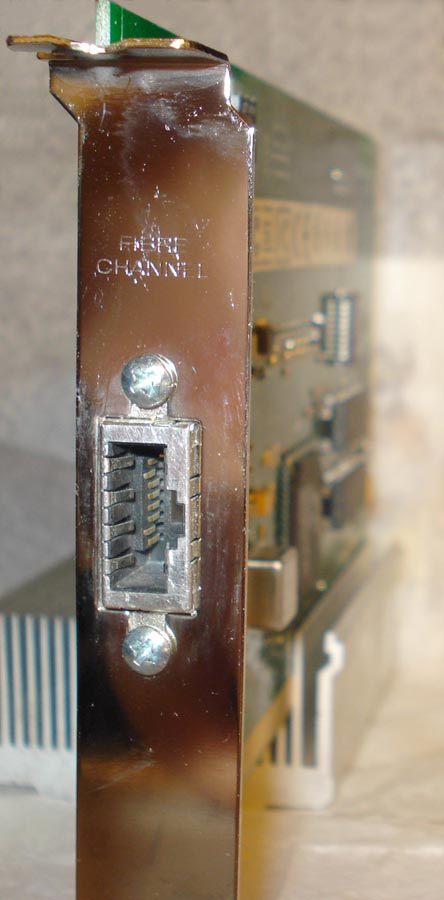
HBA FC card with electrical connector

Pin	Signal name	Comments
1	+OUT	Fibre channel output
2	GND	Optional, return for pin 7
3	-OUT	Fibre channel output
4	Module Fault Detect	Optional
5	Output Disable	Optional
6	-IN	Fibre channel input
7	+5V	Optional
8	+IN	Fibre channel input

Optional pins 2, 4, 5, and 7 are intended for use with an external optical converter. This is often called a Media Interface Assembly (MIA).

== HSSDC2 cable connector ==
7-pin High Speed Serial Data Connection (HSSDC2)

Pin	Signal name	Comments
1	GND	
2	-OUT	Fibre channel output
3	+OUT	Fibre channel output
4	GND	
5	+IN	Fibre channel input
6	-IN	Fibre channel input
7	GND	

== SCA-2 disk connector ==
40-pin SCA-2 disk connector. Although SCA-2 is the official name for this connector, it is often called SCA-40 to distinguish it by its pin count from other similar connectors.

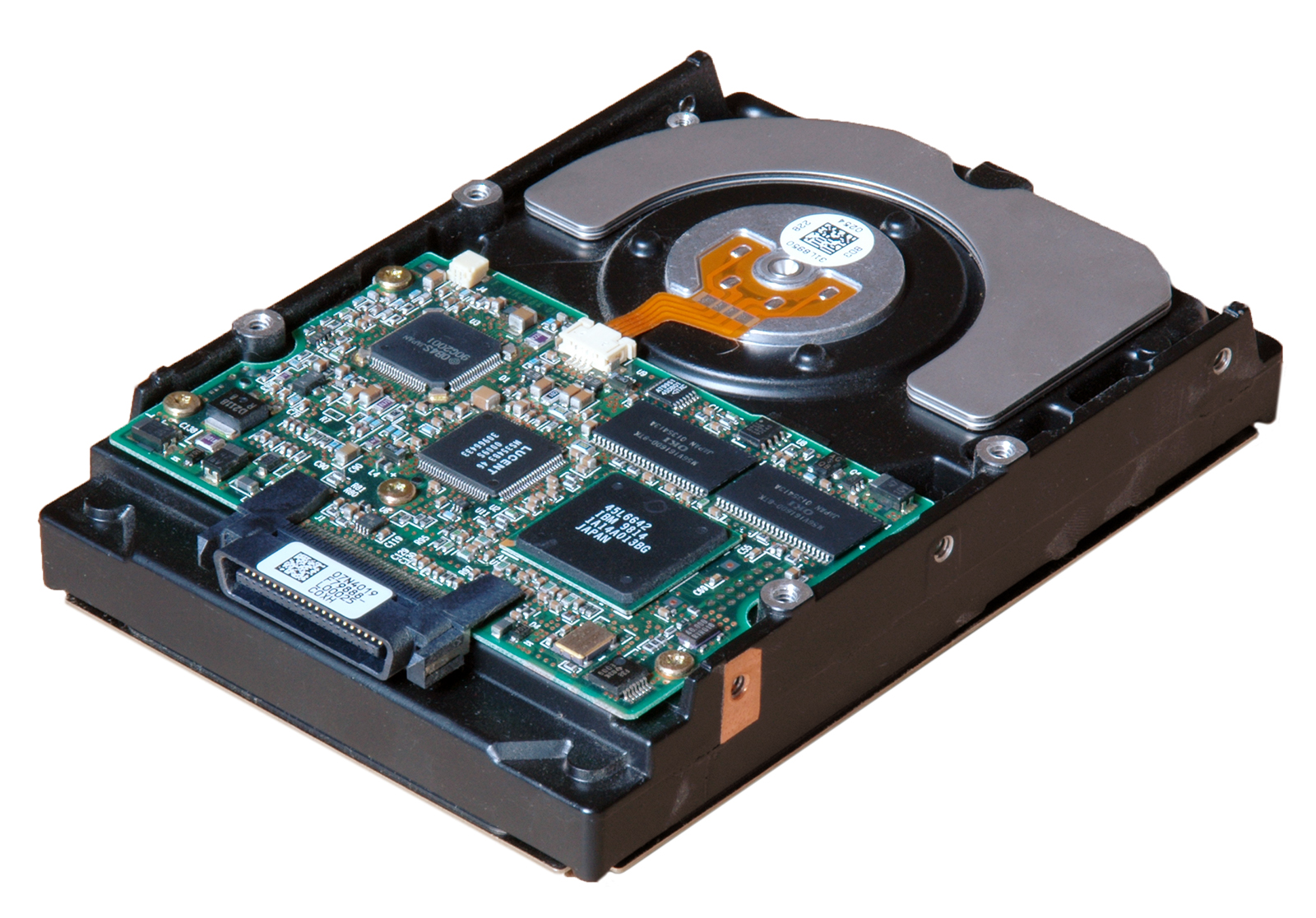
Disk with SCA-2 connector.

Pin	Signal name	Comments
1	-EN Bypass Port 1	Output driven high when port 1 is operating correctly
2	+12V	
3	+12V	
4	+12V	
5	-Parallel ESI	Input to allow ESI operation using the SELx pins
6	-Drive Present	
7	ACTLED	Output to drive the activity LED cathode
8	Power Control	
9	START1	Input to control spin-up behavior (see the Disk options section)
10	START2	Input to control spin-up behavior (see the Disk options section)
11	-EN Bypass Port 2	Output driven high when port 2 is operating correctly
12	SEL6	Device ID bit 6 / ESI write clock
13	SEL5	Device ID bit 5 / ESI read clock
14	SEL4	Device ID bit 4 / ESI acknowledge clock
15	SEL3	Device ID bit 3 / ESI bit 3
16	FLTLED	Output to drive the fault LED cathode
17	DEVCTRL2	Input to control interface speed (see the Disk options section)
18	DEVCTRL1	Input to control interface speed (see the Disk options section)
19	+5V	
20	+5V	
21	+12V Charge	
22	GND (12V)	
23	GND (12V)	
24	+IN1	Fibre channel input
25	-IN1	Fibre channel input
26	GND (12V)	
27	+IN2	Fibre channel input
28	-IN2	Fibre channel input
29	GND (12V)	
30	+OUT1	Fibre channel output
31	-OUT1	Fibre channel output
32	GND (5V)	
33	+OUT2	Fibre channel output
34	-OUT2	Fibre channel output
35	GND (5V)	
36	SEL2	Device ID bit 2 / ESI bit 2
37	SEL1	Device ID bit 1 / ESI bit 1
38	SEL0	Device ID bit 0 / ESI bit 0
39	DEVCTRL0	Input to control interface speed (see the Disk options section)
40	+5V CHARGE	

== Disk options ==
Some of the input signals to a Fibre Channel disk are used to control options, as follows:

START options - if all the disks in an enclosure spin-up immediately on power-on, this can overload the power-supply. Two methods are available to avoid that problem:

START1	START2	Spin-up behaviour
0	0	Automatic, immediate
0	1	Wait for Start Unit SCSI command
1	0	Staggered, delayed depending on loop address
1	1	Reserved

DEVCTRL options - a disk that has the wrong interface speed can cause serious problems if it is inserted into an enclosure. That problem is avoided by providing three input pins to the disk that define the interface speed at which it will operate:

DEVCTRLx value	Interface speed
0-4	Reserved
5	4 GB/s
6	2 GB/s
7	1 GB/s
