= Stas (given name) =

Stas (Russian: Стас, Ukrainian: Стас; Polish: Staś, Slovene: Staš) is a reduced form, among many, of the Slavic language given name Stanislav known under several spellings (Ukrainian: Станіслав; Russian: Станислав; Polish: Stanisław; Czech: Stanislav, etc.). It may also serve as a given name of its own. Notable people commonly referred to with the name Stas or variants include:

- Stas Pokatilov, Kazakh footballer
- Tryzuby Stas, "Tridental Stas", stage name of a Ukrainian singer-songwriter Stanislav Ivanovych Shcherbatykh
- Stas Namin, Soviet and Russian-Armenian musician
- Stas Kostyushkin, Russian singer and actor
- Stas Maliszewski, Polish American former football linebacker
- Stas Misezhnikov, Israeli politician
- Stas Piekha, Russian pop singer and actor
- Stas Mikhaylov, Russian pop singer and songwriter
- Staś Kmieć, Polish theatre and dance choreographer
- Staš Skube, Slovenian handball player

== See also ==
- Stasia "Stas" Irons
- Superman: The Animated Series, a television series commonly abbreviated as STAS
