= Stas (surname) =

Stas is a surname or a transliteration of surnames from other languages, e.g., spelling of Staš, Staś, or Russian: Стась. It may be derived from a diminutive from the given name Stanislav. Notable people with this surname include:

- Andrei Stas
- Jacques Stas, Belgian former national basketball team player
- Jean Stas, Belgian analytical chemist
- Staš, surname of multiple persons
