= SCSI Trade Association =

The SCSI Trade Association (STA, previously SCSITA), is an industry trade group which exists to promote the use of SCSI technology. It was formed in 1996. As of 2012, sponsor members include HP, Intel, LSI Logic, PMC-Sierra, and Seagate. Requirements for membership are (1) manufacturing or selling SCSI related products or services and (2) paying dues and fees, which start at $4500/year.

STA is now part of SNIA, as of 2023 (see https://www.snia.org/news_events/newsroom/announces-new-scsi-trade-association-forum). See current information about the group here: https://www.snia.org/groups/sta.

The STA does not define SCSI technical standards; that is the job of the INCITS T10 Committee. Rather, SCSITA promotes the use of SCSI and establishes standard marketing terminology and trademarks. They also foster vendor inter-operability.

== See also ==
- Serial Attached SCSI (SAS)
- SCSI – Small Computer System Interface
- INCITS – International Committee for Information Technology Standards
