= Ross =

Ross may refer to:

== People and fictional characters ==
- Ross (name), including a list of people and fictional characters with the surname or given name Ross, as well as the meaning
- Clan Ross, a Highland Scottish clan

== Places ==
=== Antarctica ===
- Ross Sea
- Ross Ice Shelf
- Ross Dependency
- Ross Island

=== Ireland ===
- "Ross", a nickname for County Roscommon
- Ross, County Mayo, a townland bordering Moyne Townland
- Ross, County Westmeath, a townland in Noughaval civil parish
- Diocese of Ross (Ireland), West Cork

=== United Kingdom ===
- Ross, Northumberland, England, a village
- Ross, Scottish Borders, a hamlet
- Ross-on-Wye, England
- Ross, Scotland, a region of Scotland and former earldom
- County of Ross, Scotland
- Diocese of Ross (Scotland)

=== United States ===
- Ross, Arkansas, an unincorporated community
- Ross, California, a town
- Ross, Indiana, an unincorporated community
- Ross, Iowa, an unincorporated community
- Ross, Minnesota, an unincorporated community
- Ross, North Dakota, a city
- Ross, Ohio, a census-designated place
- Ross County, Ohio
- Ross, Texas, a city
- Ross City, Texas, an unincorporated community
- Ross, Wisconsin (disambiguation)
- Ross Township (disambiguation)
- Ross Peak, a mountain in Montana

=== Elsewhere ===
- Ross, Tasmania, Australia
- Ross, New Zealand
- RoSS, the Republic of South Sudan
- Ross River (Queensland), the main river that flows through Townsville, Queensland, Australia
- Ross River (Eastmain River), a tributary of the Eastmain River in Nord-du-Québec, Québec, Canada
- Ross River (Yukon), Canada, one of the main tributaries of the Pelly River

=== Space ===
- Ross (lunar crater)
- Ross (Martian crater)
- Ross 248, a star

== Business ==
- Ross (optics), a London, England-based lens company
- Ross Casino, Pichilemu, Chile; now the Agustín Ross Cultural Centre
- Ross Group, a British fish and frozen food company
- Ross Laboratories, a former subsidiary of the American Abbott Laboratories pharmaceutical company now known as Abbott Nutrition
- Ross Stores, an American department store chain
- Ross Technology, an American semiconductor company
- Ross Video, a Canadian company that produces video production equipment

== Schools ==
- Ross School of Business, part of the University of Michigan
- Ross University School of Medicine, an international medical school in Dominica
- Ross University School of Veterinary Medicine, an international medical school in St. Kitts
- School of Ross, a monastic institution in County Cork, Ireland

== Arts and entertainment ==
- Ross (play), a 1960 play by Terence Rattigan
- Ross (1978 album), by Diana Ross
- Ross (1983 album), by Diana Ross
- Ross (Low Roar album)

== Ships ==
- USS Ross, several U.S. Navy ships
- HMS Ross (J45), a Royal Navy minesweeper

== Transportation ==
- Ross (bicycles)
- Ross (gasoline automobile), produced 1915–1918
- Ross (steam automobile), produced 1906–1909

== Other uses ==
- Earl of Ross, a peerage of Scotland
- Ross Mathematics Program, a summer program at Ohio State University
- Ross rifle
- Resource Ordering Status System, a database for fighting wildfires
- Retuinskih's System ROSS, a martial system

== See also ==
- Ross Bridge (disambiguation)
- Ross Island (disambiguation)
- Fort Ross (disambiguation)
- Ross procedure, a cardiac surgery operation
- Ross seal, a species of Antarctic seal
- Rosse (disambiguation)
- Rossi (disambiguation)
- Ros (disambiguation)
- Ríos (disambiguation)
