= Ros =

Ros or ROS or RoS may refer to:

== Organizations ==
- Raggruppamento Operativo Speciale, the Anti-organized Crime Branch of the Italian Carabinieri
- Registers of Scotland, a Scottish authority responsible for compiling and maintaining records
- Reparti i Operacioneve Speciale, a former Albanian special forces unit
- IL ROS, Norwegian football team

== People and titles ==
- Scottish Gaelic spelling of the name Ross
- Baron de Ros

=== Surname ===
- Ana Ros Camacho, Spanish mathematician
- Ana Roš (born 1972), Slovene cook
- Arno Ros (born 1942), German philosopher
- Carmen Ros Nortes (born 1953), Catholic nun and Vatican official
- Edmundo Ros (1910–2011), Trinidadian-British musician
- Enrique Ros (1924–2013), Cuban-American businessman and activist
- Fran Roš (1898–1976), Slovene writer
- Giuseppe Ros (1942–2022), Italian boxer
- Iñigo Ros (born 1982), Spanish footballer
- Isidro Ros Ríos (born 1995), Spanish footballer
- Jaime Ros, (born 1952), Spanish alpine skier
- Javier Ros (born 1990), Spanish footballer
- José Ros García (1920–2001), Spanish poet
- Katarina Stenström Ros (born 1966), Swedish politician
- Lázaro Ros (1925–2005), Cuban singer
- Ramón Ros (born 1981), Spanish footballer
- Richard Ros (born 1429), English poet
- Amanda McKittrick Ros (1860–1939), Irish writer
- Mohd Remezey Che Ros (born 1982), Malaysian footballer
- Uilleam Ros, Scottish Gaelic poet
- Juan Antonio Ros (born 1996), Spanish footballer
- Ros Saboeut (c. 1942–2014), Cambodian musician
- Ros Serey Sothea (1948–1977), Cambodian singer
- Ros Sopheap (born 1962), Cambodian women's rights activist

=== Given name ===
- Ros Atkins (born 1974), British journalist
- Ros Bates (born 1962), Australian politician
- Ros Childs (born 1967), British journalist
- Ros Drinkwater (born 1944), Scottish actress
- Ros Evans (born 1960), British athlete
- Ros Kelly (born 1948), Australian politician
- Ros Kember (born 1985), New Zealand cricketer
- Ros Pesman (born 1938), Australian historian
- Ros Spence (born 1970), Australian politician
- Ros Myers, fictional character

== Places ==
- Lake Roś, Poland
- Republic of Singapore, a country in South-East Asia
- Reserve Officer School, a conscript training facility in Finland
- Ros, Belarus, an urban-type settlement in Grodno Region, Belarus
- Ros (river), Ukraine

== Science and technology ==
- Reactive oxygen species, chemically reactive molecules containing oxygen
- ReactOS, a free and open-source operating system intended to be binary-compatible with Windows NT
- ROS1, receptor tyrosine kinase
- ROS, a weak signal sound card mode for Amateur Radio
- Rod outer segment, the light-sensitive part of the retina of the eye
- Robot Operating System, an open-source robotics platform by Willow Garage and Stanford AI Labs
- ROM Operating System, a ROMed version of Digital Research's DR DOS
- Russian Orbital Service Station, a proposed space station
- Russian Orbital Segment, components of the International Space Station
- Random orbital sander, also called palm sander, a hand-power tool

== Transportation ==
- Rosanna railway station, Melbourne
- Rosario – Islas Malvinas International Airport, Argentina
- Rosyth railway station, Fife, Scotland (National Rail station code)

== Other uses ==
- Ros (grape), another name for the wine grape Mourvèdre
- Ros (vehicles), a Greek light truck manufacturer
- Reaper of Souls, an expansion to the game Diablo 3
- Return on sales, an accounting ratio that detects operational efficiency
- Review of systems, medical
- Star Wars: The Rise of Skywalker, a 2019 film

== See also ==
- Ross (disambiguation)
- Da Ros, surname
- Ríos (disambiguation)
- Rosas (surname), of which Ros is a spelling variation
- Rot (disambiguation)
- RDOS (disambiguation)
- Rots (disambiguation)
- Tros (disambiguation)
