= Da Ros =

Da Ros is an Italian surname. Notable people with the surname include:

- Gianni Da Ros (born 1986), Italian cyclist
- João Luiz da Ros (born 1982), Brazilian rugby union player
- Emanuela Da Ros (born 1959), Italian writer of children's books and journalist
- Scott DaRos, American animator and animation director

See also:

- Gianmario Tondato Da Ruos, Italian business executive
- Luigi da Rios, Italian painter
