= SS-20 (disambiguation) =

SS-20 may refer to:

- The NATO reporting name of Soviet nuclear ballistic missile RT-21M Pioneer
- SS-20, a Polish punk band, later renamed Dezerter
- The Sun Microsystems SPARCstation 20.
