= Solbourne Computer =

Solbourne Computer, Inc.
- Industry: Computers
- Founded: 1986; 39 years ago
- Founder: Douglas MacGregor
- Defunct: 2008
- Fate: Merged into Deloitte Consulting
- Headquarters: Longmont, Colorado, United States
- Number of employees: Over 250 (1990)
- Parent: Matsushita (52%, 1986)

Solbourne Computer, Inc. was originally a vendor of computer systems based in Longmont, Colorado, United States, at first 52% owned by Matsushita. In the late 1980s and early 1990s, the company produced a range of computer workstations and servers based on the SPARC microprocessor architecture, largely compatible with Sun Microsystems' Sun-4 systems. Some of these are notable for supporting symmetric multiprocessing some time before Sun themselves produced multiprocessor systems. Even when Sun produced multiprocessor systems, SunOS uses an asymmetric multiprocessing model rather than OS/MP's symmetric multiprocessing model; Sun would not adopt symmetric multiprocessing until the release of Solaris 2.0 in 1992. Due to the cost of engineering and producing new systems to compete with Sun's increasingly competitive hardware offerings and the loss of symmetric multiprocessing as a distinguishing feature, in 1994, Solbourne left the computer hardware business, with Grumman Systems Support Corporation taking over support for Solbourne customers until 2000.

In 1994, Walt Pounds assumed the role of CEO of Solbourne, and the Solbourne headquarters were moved to Boulder, Colorado. From that point until July 2008, Solbourne focused on providing consulting services and solutions based on Oracle Applications and associated technologies. Solbourne established a strong reputation in the Oracle E-Business Suite community, and became a dominant provider of consulting services to state and local Oracle E-Business Suite customers.

On July 11, 2008, Solbourne closed a transaction to sell substantially all of the company assets to Deloitte Consulting. The Solbourne management team and more than 100 professionals joined Deloitte's Enterprise Applications, Technology Integration and Human Capital service areas.

== Models ==
Solbourne's range comprises the following:

- Multiprocessor workstations and servers using the KBus 64-bit inter-processor bus:
  - Series4: 16.67 MHz Fujitsu MB86900 processor(s)
  - Series5: 33 MHz Cypress CY7C601 processor(s)
  - Series5e: 40 MHz Cypress CY7C601 processor(s)
  - Series6: 33 MHz SuperSPARC processor(s)
  - Series6E: 50 MHz SuperSPARC processor(s)
- Single-processor IDT (Integrated DeskTop) workstations based on the Panasonic MN10501 KAP SPARC-compatible processor:
  - S3000: portable workstation with integrated plasma display
  - S4000: 33 MHz CPU "pizza-box"-style desktop workstation
  - S4000DX: 36 MHz S4000 with secondary processor cache

The MN10501 processor had been developed by Solbourne in association with Matsushita, providing a single-chip product featuring an integrated floating-point arithmetic unit, memory management hardware, branch prediction logic, 8 KB of cache memory, a 64-bit data bus, and "mostly 64-bit data paths on chip".

== Operating systems ==
All Solbourne systems run OS/MP, a modified version of SunOS 4.1 supporting multiprocessor systems. The final release of OS/MP was 4.1D, corresponding to SunOS 4.1.3.

As of 2017, some work has been done in porting OpenBSD to Solbourne IDT workstations.
