= ROTM =

ROTM may refer to:

- ROTM, ICAO airport code of Marine Corps Air Station Futenma in Okinawa, Japan
- ROTM, abbreviation of "Rock of the Marne", nickname of the 3rd Infantry Division (United States)
- T3:ROTM, abbreviation for the 2003 movie Terminator 3: Rise of the Machines
- "Return of the Mack", 1996 song by British singer Mark Morrison

== See also ==
- Rise of the Machines (disambiguation)
- ROT (disambiguation)
