= Rotten =

Rotten may refer to something that has rotted, or:

- Axl Rotten, ring name of American professional wrestler Brian Knighton (1971–2016)
- Bonnie Rotten, American former pornographic actress, feature dancer, fetish model, and director
- Dot Rotten, a stage name of Zeph Ellis (1988–2026), English rapper
- Ian Rotten, ring name of American professional wrestler John Benson Williams (born 1970)
- Robbie Rotten, a main antagonist character on the children's television show LazyTown
- Johnny Rotten, former stage name of John Lydon (born 1956), British musician, lead singer of the Sex Pistols and Public Image Ltd
- Rotten, a German name of the river Rhône
- Rotten (TV series), a 2018 documentary television series
- "Rotten", a 2017 song by Zomboy from Rott N’ Roll, Pt. 1
- Rotten Records, an American record label

== See also ==
- Rot (disambiguation)
- Roton (disambiguation)
- Biodegradation, the process of rotting
- Rotten.com, a United States-hosted shock site
