= Rot =

Rot(s) or rotting may refer to:

== Decay ==
=== Organic matter ===
- Rot, decomposition of organic matter
  - Dry rot, of wood
  - Root rot
  - Wet rot, of wood and other cellulose-rich plant matter
- Necrosis, of tissue

=== Technology ===
- Bit rot, data degradation
  - Software rot, a form of bit rot
- Disk rot, also called CD Rot or DVD rot, the physical decay of optical disks
- Link rot, hyperlinks becoming broken
- Root of trust, authoritative entity for which trust is assumed and not derived

== Film and literature ==
- Rot (2019 film), a horror drama film directed by Andrew Merrill
- Rot (upcoming film), an American psychological body horror film directed by Alexandra Magistro
- Rot (book), a 2025 book by Padraic X. Scanlan

== Music ==
- Rot (album), an album by German rapper Sabrina Setlur
- Rot (SITD), an album by the German band [:SITD:]
- Rotting (EP), by the Brazilian metal band Sarcofago
- "Rot", a song by Northlane from their 2015 album Node
- "Rotting", a song by Green Day from their 2002 album Shenanigans
- "The Rot", a song by Dean Blunt from his 2021 album Black Metal 2

== Places ==
- Rot (Bad Mergentheim), a subdivision of the town of Bad Mergentheim in Baden-Württemberg, Germany
- Rot (Apfelstädt), a river of Thuringia, Germany
- Rot (Danube), a river in Upper Swabia, Germany
- Rot (Kocher), a river of Baden-Württemberg, Germany
- Rot an der Rot, a village on the Rot river, Baden-Württemberg, Germany
- Rot, Sweden, a village in the Älvdalen Municipality, Sweden

== Other uses ==
- Rot (mathematics), rotation vector operator
- Brain rot, slang for poor-quality digital content

== See also ==
- ROT (disambiguation)
- ROTS (disambiguation)
- Roth (disambiguation)
- Rott (disambiguation)
- Rotten (disambiguation)
