= SPARCstation 20 =

1994 Sun Microsystems workstation

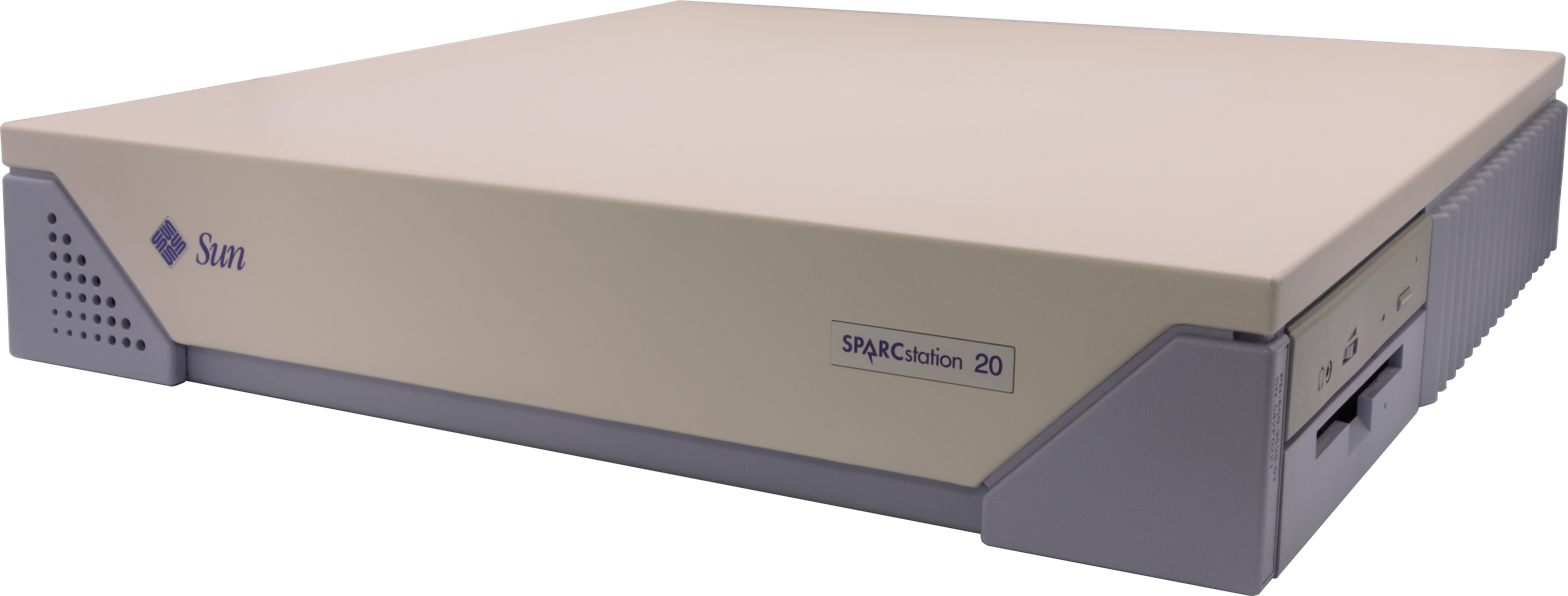
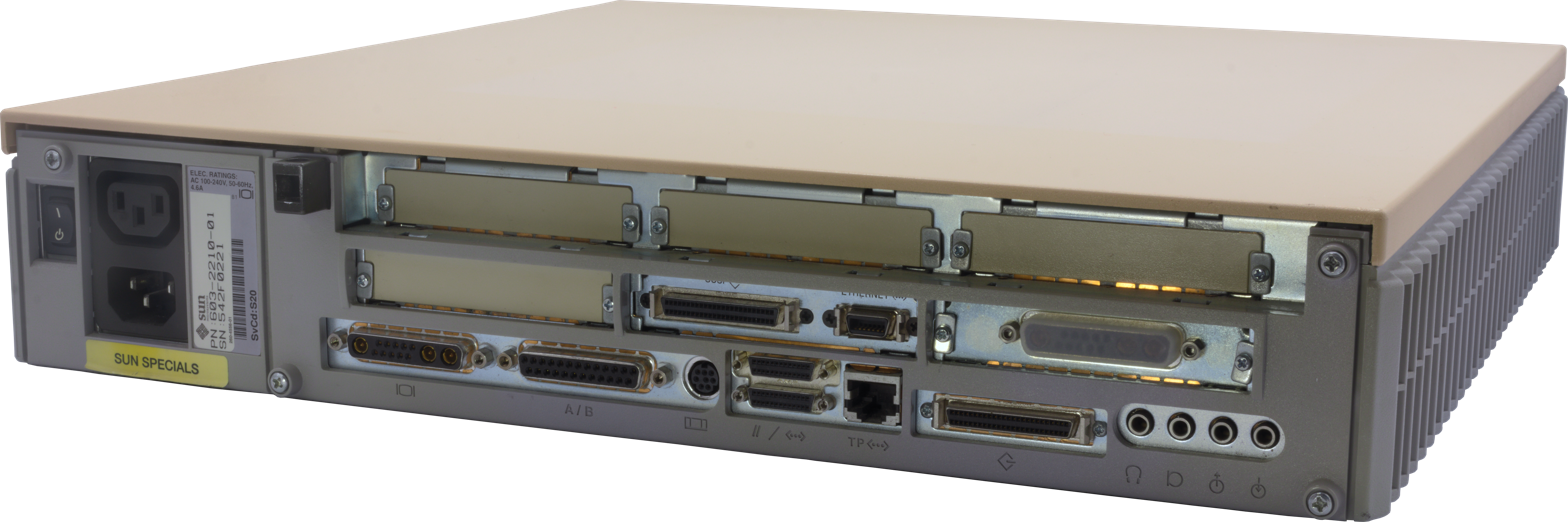
- SPARCstation 20 front and rear
- Codename: Kodiak
- Developer: Sun Microsystems
- Manufacturer: Sun Microsystems
- Type: Workstation
- Released: March 29, 1994; 31 years ago
- Availability: March 29, 1994
- Introductory price: $12,195–29,995
- Operating system: SunOS; Solaris
- CPU: SuperSPARC or hyperSPARC
- Memory: 64–512 MB
- Predecessor: SPARCstation 10
- Successor: Ultra 2
- Website: sun.com at the Wayback Machine (archived 1996-12-20)

The SPARCstation 20 (code-named Kodiak) is a workstation made by Sun Microsystems. The SPARCstation 20 was released on March 29, 1994, alongside the lower-end SPARCstation 5. The SPARCstation 20 shipped with dual SuperSPARC or hyperSPARC CPUs, supporting up to four such CPUs all running in parallel. It sold for between US$12,195 at the low end to US$29,995 at the high end (equivalent to $38,165–119,676 in 2024). Sun superseded the SPARCstation line in November 1995 with the Ultra series, which featured UltraSPARC processors.

== Specifications ==
=== CPU support ===
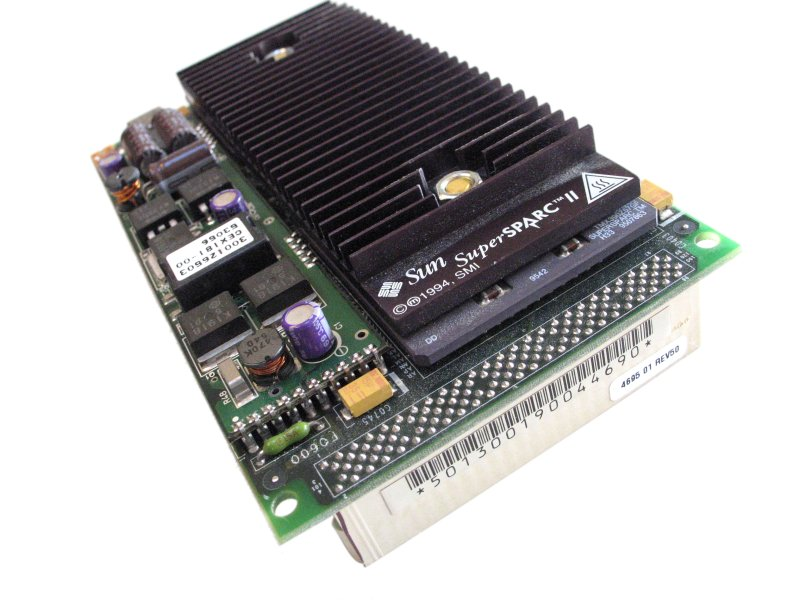
SM71 SPARCstation MBus CPU module

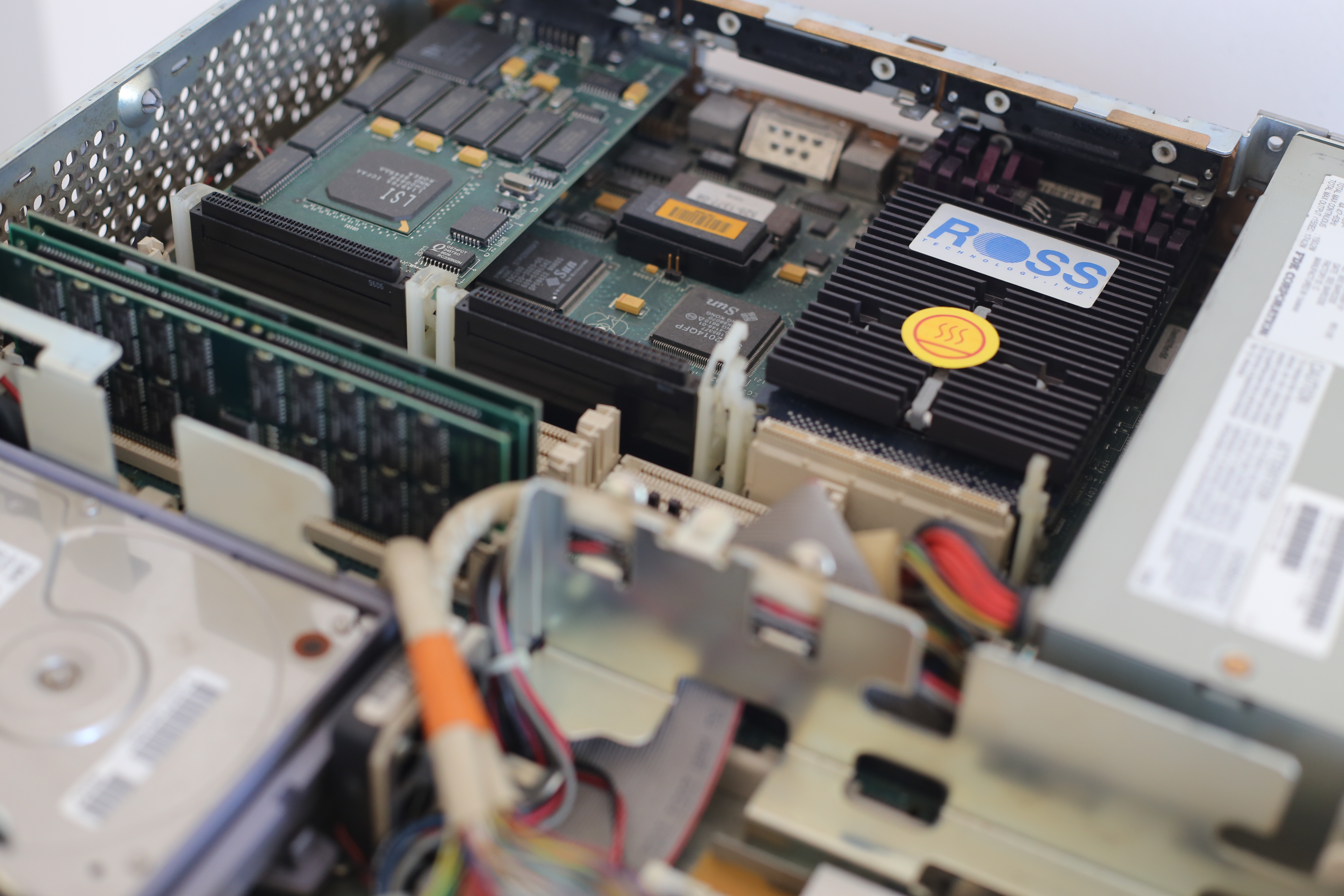
Interior of a SPARCstation 20 with Ross MBus CPU module

The SPARCstation 20 has dual 50 MHz MBus ports that allow it to use faster CPUs than the SPARCstation 10. With two dual-CPU modules and updated firmware, the SPARCstation 20 supports a maximum of four CPUs. The fastest CPU produced for the SPARCstation 20 is the 200 MHz Ross hyperSPARC.

The PROM in the SPARCstation 20 determines CPU compatibility. Version 2.25 is the last BootPROM release from Sun, and 2.25R from Ross.

=== Memory ===
The SPARCstation 20 has eight 200-pin DSIMM slots, and supports a maximum of 512 MB of memory with 64 MB modules. Memory modules for the SPARCstation 20 are compatible with the SPARCstation 10, Sun Ultra 1, and some other computers in the sun4m and sun4u families, but they are physically incompatible with the SIMM slots found in PC computers.

Two of the eight SIMM slots are wider than the others and can be used with non-memory peripherals like caching NVSIMM and video VSIMM cards.

=== Disk drives ===
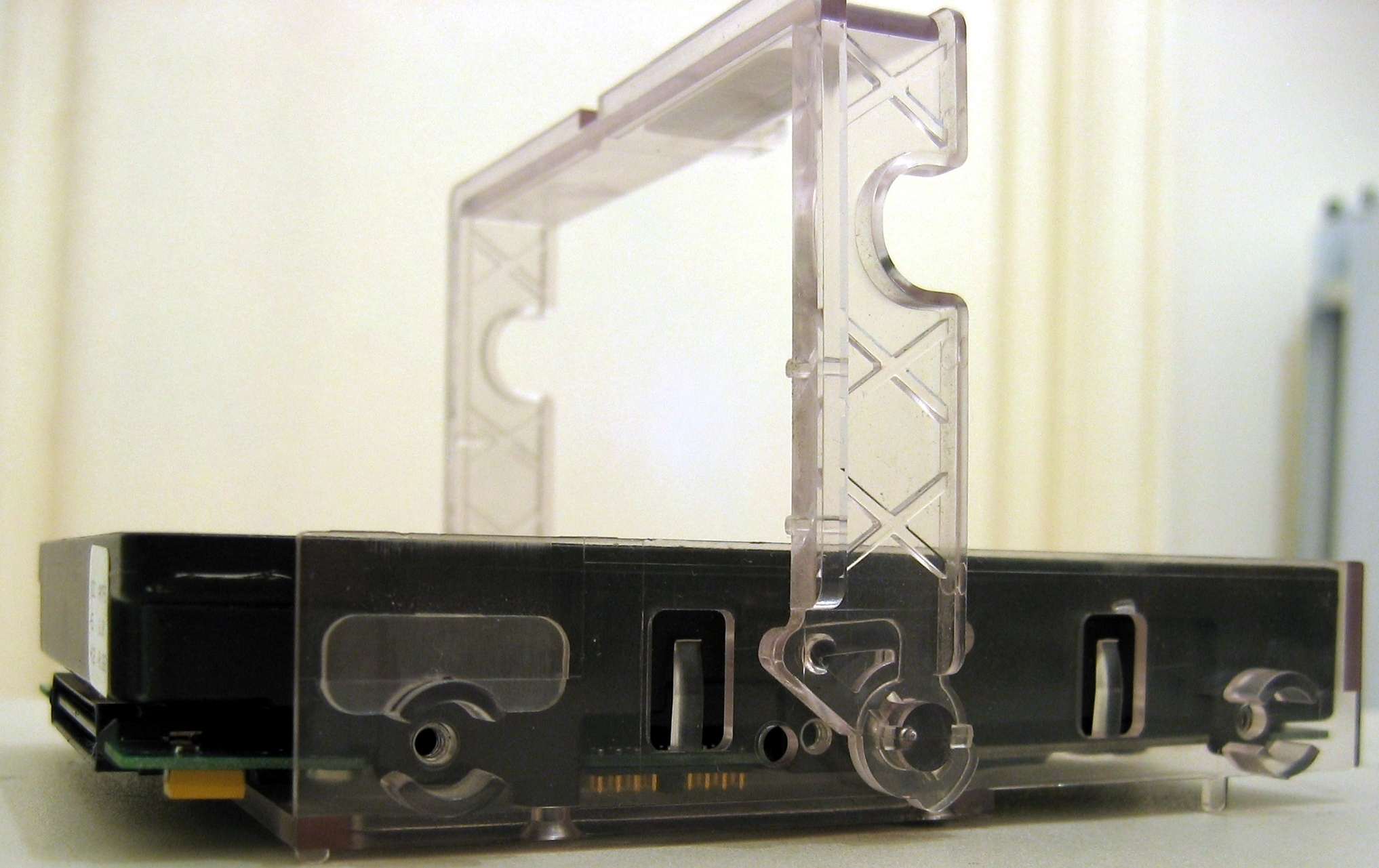
SPARCstation 20 SCSI cradle with drive

The SPARCstation 20 has two internal SCA bays, an external SCSI connector, and two bays for CD-ROM or floppy drives. Earlier revisions of the SPARCstation 20 case contain a CD-ROM and floppy bays that are slightly shorter than a standard 3.5" bay and regular devices intended for PC compatible computers do not usually fit. Later revisions of the SPARCstation 20 and SPARCstation 5 have a narrower slot for the floppy drive so a more-standard CD-ROM can fit.

The SCSI host controller is integrated with the motherboard. The SPARCstation 20 does not support IDE devices.

A limitation in all releases of the OpenBoot PROM for the SPARCstation 20 prevents it from booting from a point on a disk past the 2 gigabyte mark.

=== Network ===
The SPARCstation 20 has one integrated AMD Lance 10BASE-T Ethernet interface, along with a custom 26-pin AUI interface. Additional Ethernet interfaces can be added with an SBus card.

=== Graphics ===
The SPARCstation 20 has a built-in 13W3 video socket driven by an optional SX (CG14) framebuffer built onto a VSIMM. The VSIMM is available in 4 MB or 8 MB capacity, capable of up to 1152 × 900 (4 MB) or 1280 × 1024 (8 MB) in 24-bit color. If two VSIMMs are installed, an auxiliary video board must also be installed to provide a second 13W3 video socket. Alternatively, SBus cards can be used, including the 8-bit color Turbo GX (CG6), 24-bit color ZX (Leo) and others.

=== Sound ===
The SPARCstation 20 has integrated sound with four standard 3.5 mm audio jacks for headphones, microphone, line in, and line out.

== NVRAM ==
The SPARCstation 20 uses a battery-backed NVRAM module to hold data about the system, such as the host ID (serial number) and MAC address. If the battery on the chip dies, then the NVRAM module must be replaced (or modified to use an external battery), and the NVRAM must be reprogrammed with a MAC address and host ID. Optionally a M48T08-100PC1 can be used.

== Operating systems ==
- SunOS 4.1.3_U1B onwards
- Solaris 2.3 to 9
- Linux (Debian, Gentoo, SuSE 7.0 - 7.3, probably others)
- NetBSD
- OpenBSD (up to 5.9)
- MirOS BSD
- NeXTSTEP 3.3 and OPENSTEP 4.x (SuperSPARC CPU modules only)

== Notable uses ==
- 117 SPARCstation 20 Model HS11 units, 87 with two 100 MHz hyperSPARC processors and 30 with four 100 MHz hyperSPARC processors, plus a single octo-processor SPARCserver 1000 were used to render Toy Story.

== Related computers ==
- SPARCstation 5
- SPARCstation 10
