= Rosse =

Rosse may refer to:

== People ==
- Eric Rosse, American record producer and composer
- Frederick Rosse (1867–1940), English composer
- Herman Rosse (1887–1965), Dutch-born American architect, painter, theatrical designer and art director
- John Ross (bishop of Exeter) (1719–1792), also spelled Rosse
- Mary Rosse (1813–1885), British astronomer and photographer
- Susan Penelope Rosse (1652–1700), English painter

== Other uses ==
- Earl of Rosse, two titles in the Peerage of Ireland
- Rosse (crater), a lunar impact crater
- Rosse Bay, a bay of Qikiqtaaluk Region, Nunavut, Canada

== See also ==
- Ross (disambiguation)
