= TRO =

TRO or tro may refer to:

== Music ==
- Tro (instrument), Cambodian string instrument
- "Tro" (song), 1996, Marie Fredriksson
- The Richmond Organization, Inc., American music publisher

== Other uses ==
- TRO (gene) or trophinin, a human protein involved in cell adhesion
- TRO (company), American architects
- Televisión Regional del Oriente, Colombian television network
- Tamils Rehabilitation Organisation
- Temporary restraining order, in American law
- Taree Airport, New South Wales, Australia (IATA code: TRO)
- Traffic Regulation Order, in the law of England and Wales
