= Rise of the Machines (disambiguation) =

Terminator 3: Rise of the Machines is a 2003 film in the Terminator media franchise.

Rise of the Machines or Rise of the Machine may also refer to:

== Games ==
- Terminator 3: Rise of the Machines (video game), a 2003 videogame based on the eponymous film
- Terminator 3: Rise of the Machines (pinball), a 2003 arcade pinball machine themed like the eponymous film

== Music ==
- Terminator 3: Rise of the Machines (soundtrack), a 2003 film soundtrack album for the eponymous film
- Rise of the Machine, a 2014 album by Deep Machine
- "Rise of the Machines", a 2003 single and song by Jedi Mind Tricks
- "Rise of the Machine", a song by Badger off the 2005 DJ Sasha album Fundacion NYC
- Rise of the Machine, a 2019 concert tour by Dope (band)

== Television ==
- "Rise of the Machines" (Cunk on Earth), a 2022 episode
- "Rise of the Machine", an episode of the series Bunk'd
- "Rise of the Machine" (Russian: Восстание машин), an episode of the animated series KikoRiki

== See also ==
- ROTM (disambiguation)
- Rise of the Robots (disambiguation)
