= Rots =

Rots or ROTS may refer to:

- Rots, Calvados, a commune in Basse-Normandie, France
- Daan Rots (born 2001), Dutch professional footballer
- Esther Rots (born 1972), Dutch film director
- Mats Rots (born 2005), Dutch footballer
- Star Wars: Episode III – Revenge of the Sith, a 2005 space opera film

== See also ==
- Revenge of the Screen Savers, abbreviated ROTSS
- Rot (disambiguation)
- Ros (disambiguation)
