= RDOS =

RDOS may refer to:

- Regional District of Okanagan-Similkameen, a regional district of British Columbia
- Data General RDOS, a real-time operating system by Data General since 1972
- Cromemco RDOS, the resident operating system on some Cromemco S-100 cards
- RDOS (Microsoft), a name sometimes used for the Russian versions of MS-DOS 4.01 and 5.00
- RDOS (Ekblad), a 32-bit DOS-compatible operating system by Leif Ekblad since 1988

== See also ==
- DOS (disambiguation)
- ROS (disambiguation)
- RTOS, real-time operating system
- REAL/32
