= Rise of the Robots (disambiguation) =

Rise of the Robots is a 1994 video game.

Rise of the Robots may also refer to:

- Rise of the Robots (book), 2015 book by Martin Ford
- Rise 2: Resurrection, also known as Rise of the Robots 2, sequel to the 1994 video game
- "Rise of the Robots", a lecture by Kevin Warwick
- "Hey! (Rise of the Robots)", a song by The Stranglers from Black and White

== See also ==
- Rise Robots Rise, experimental hip hop group
- Rise of the Machines (disambiguation)
- AI takeover, a hypothetical scenario in which artificial intelligence takes over human intelligence
