= Tros =

Tros or TROS may refer to:

- Tros, a taxonomic synonym for the plant genus Narcissus
- 18281 Tros, an asteroid
- Tros, a crater on Jupiter's moon Ganymede
- Transformer read-only storage, a type of read-only memory
- TROS, a Dutch broadcasting union, originally an acronym for Televisie Radio Omroep Stichting
- Tros (mythology), a figure in Greek mythology who was the eponymous ancestor of the Trojans
- Tros, Poland, a village
- Tros of Samothrace, fictional Greek freedom fighter in the works of Talbot Mundy
- TRoS or The Riddle of Steel, a roleplaying game
- Star Wars: The Rise of Skywalker, a 2019 Star Wars film

== See also ==
- TRO (disambiguation)
