= Gianni Da Ros =

Italian cyclist

Gianni da Ros
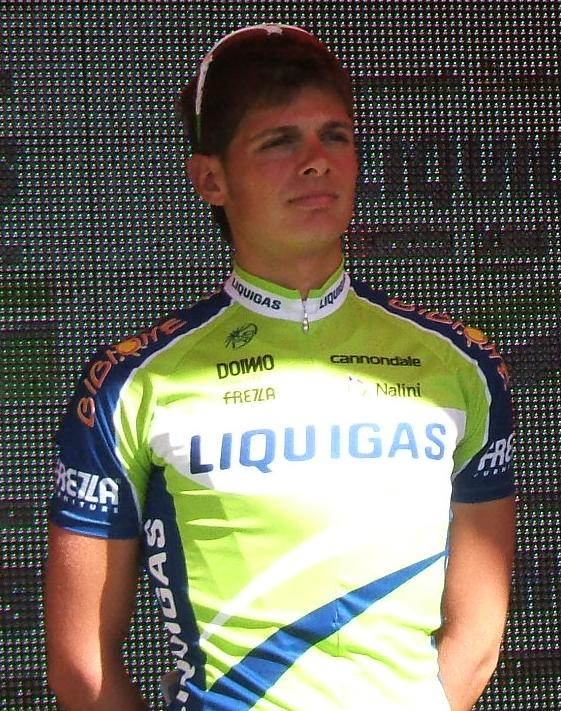

Personal information
- Full name: Gianni da Ros
- Born: 26 August 1986 (age 40) Pordenone, Italy

Cycling career
- Sport: Cycling
- Discipline: Road
- Role: Rider
- Rider type: Sprinter

Professional team
- 2008: Liquigas

Gianni Da Ros (born 26 August 1986, in Pordenone) is an Italian professional road bicycle racer who rode one season for UCI ProTour team Liquigas.

On Wednesday 11 March 2009, Da Ros was arrested by Italian police investigating the trafficking of banned doping products.

On 23 November 2009, he was handed a record 20-year ban from the National Anti-doping Tribunal for trafficking doping substances. This was later reduced to four years by the Court of Arbitration, with his ban ending in March 2013.
