= Fort Ross (disambiguation) =

Fort Ross may refer to:

- Fort Ross, California, United States
- Fort Ross, Nunavut, Canada
- Fort Ross (HBC vessel), operated by the HBC from 1938 to 1950, see Hudson's Bay Company vessels

Fort Ross may also refer to:

- Fort Ross Weevil, scientific name Trigonoscuta rossi, a species of beetle
- Fort Ross (film), film set in Fort Ross, California, during Russian colonialism
- Fort-Ross Consortium, an industry organization that merged into Russoft in 2004
