= Luigi da Rios =

Italian painter (1843–1892)

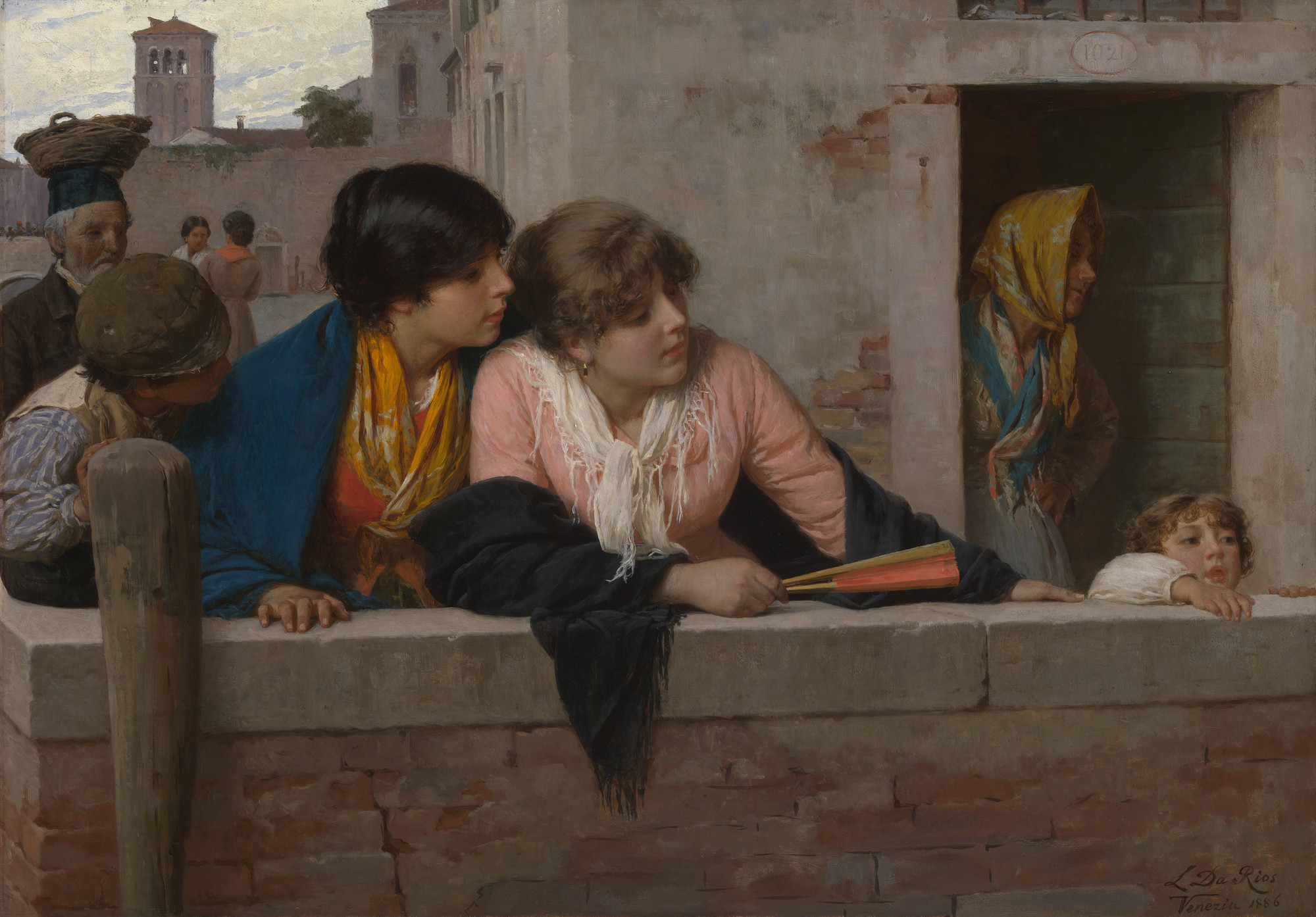
Overlooking a Canal, Venice (1886)

Luigi da Rios (1843 – February 1892) was an Italian painter.

== Biography ==
He was born in Ceneda, Vittorio Veneto. He was a pupil at the Academy of Fine Arts of Venice, where he won a number of awards. Forced into exile to avoid conscription into the Austrian armies, he fled to Florence in May 1866. With the end of the conflict, he returned to Venice, and began to paint portraits, genre, and historical subjects.

He exhibited frequently from 1867 to 1882 at the yearly exhibitions of the Venetian Promotrice di Belle Arti. Among his works are: Una cameriera, Torquato Tasso, Raffaello e la Fornarina, Le donne al pozzo (won first prize in 1872 at the Regional Exhibition at Treviso), Le analfabete (the illiterate), L'orfanella, Una calle a Venezia, Dopo la messa, Dopo il lavoro, and Lettura. He also exhibited in 1881 at Milano, 1887 at Venice, and at the Royal Academy of London.

He painted frescoes for Villa Bisacco-Palazzi in Chirignago (1864), in Villa Visconti di Modrone on Lake Como (1866) and in the parish church of Chirignago (1878). He was appointed academic of merit to the Venetian Academy, and member of the Society of Watercolor painters of Brussels. He died in Venice in 1892.
