= MBus (SPARC) =

Computer bus introduced in 1991

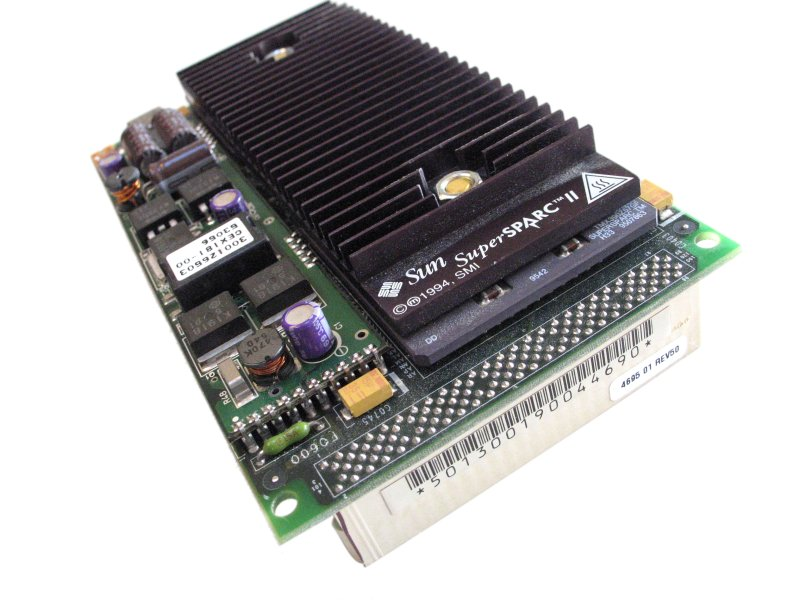
MBus module, Sun SuperSPARC II SM71

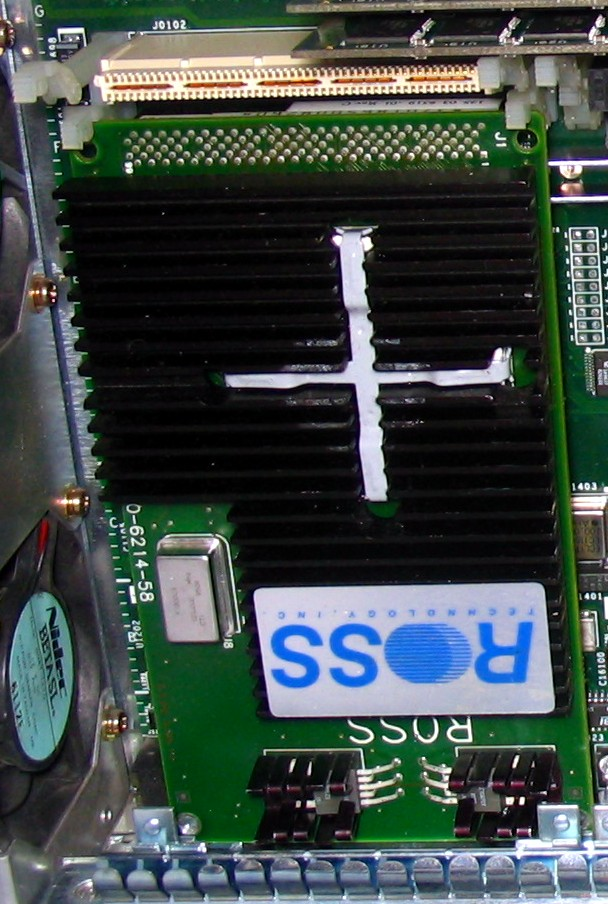
Two MBus connectors (top of photograph), one occupied by CPU module

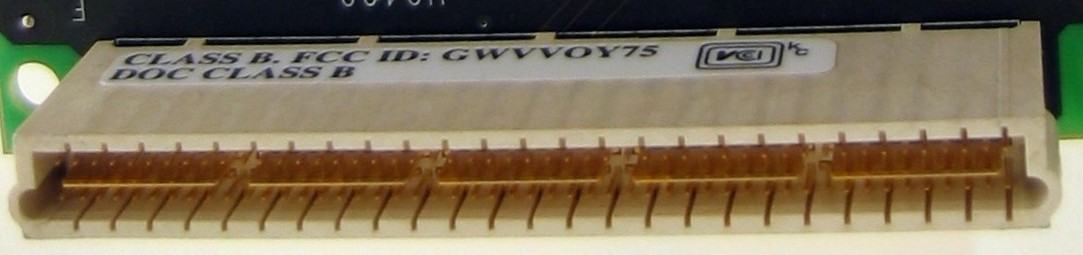
MBus male connector

MBus is a computer bus designed and implemented by Sun Microsystems for communication between high speed computer system components, such as the central processing unit, motherboard and main memory. SBus is used in the same machines to connect add-on cards to the motherboard.

MBus was first used in Sun's first multiprocessor SPARC-based system, the SPARCserver 600MP series (launched in 1991), and later found use in the SPARCstation 10 and SPARCstation 20 workstations. The bus permits the integration of several microprocessors on a single motherboard, in a multiprocessing configuration with up to eight CPUs packaged in detachable MBus modules. In practice, the number of processors per MBus is limited to four. Single processor systems were also sold that use the MBus protocol internally, but with the CPUs permanently attached to the motherboard to lower manufacturing costs.

MBus specifies a 64-bit datapath, which uses 36-bit physical addressing, giving an address space of 64 GB. The transfer rate is 80 MB/s sustained (320 MB/s peak) at 40 MHz, or 100 MB/s (400 MB/s peak) at 50 MHz. Bus controlling is done by an arbiter. Interrupt, reset, and timeout logic are also specified.

== Related buses ==
Several related buses were also developed:

=== XBus ===
XBus is a packet-switched bus used in the SPARCserver 1000, SPARCcenter 2000 and Cray CS6400. This corresponds to the circuit-switched MBus, with identical electrical characteristics and physical form factor but an incompatible signalling protocol.

=== KBus ===
KBus is a high-speed interconnection system for linking multiple MBuses, used in Solbourne Computer Series 6 and Series 7 computer systems.

== History ==
The MBus standard was cooperatively developed by Sun and Ross Technology and released in 1991.

Manufacturers who produced computer systems using the MBus included Sun, Ross Technology, Hyundai/Axil, Fujitsu, Solbourne Computer, Tatung, GCS, Auspex, ITRI, ICL, Cray, Amdahl, Themis, DTK and Kamstrup.

== See also ==
- List of interface bit rates
