= Trophinin =

Protein-coding gene in the species Homo sapiens

TRO

Identifiers
- Aliases: TRO, MAGE-d3, MAGED3, trophinin
- External IDs: OMIM: 300132; MGI: 1928994; GeneCards: TRO

Gene location (Human)
Chr.	X chromosome (human)
Band	Xp11.21	Start	54,920,462 bp
Band	Xp11.21	End	54,931,431 bp

Gene location (Mouse)
Chr.	X chromosome (mouse)
Band	X|X F3	Start	149,428,300 bp
Band	X|X F3	End	149,440,579 bp
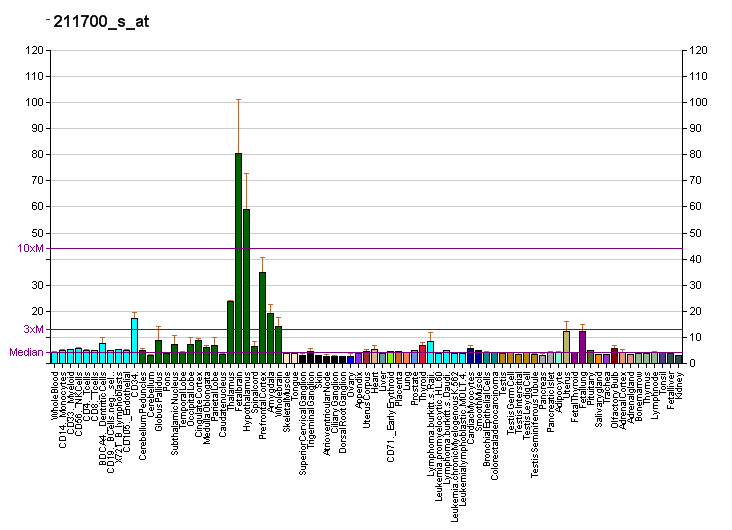

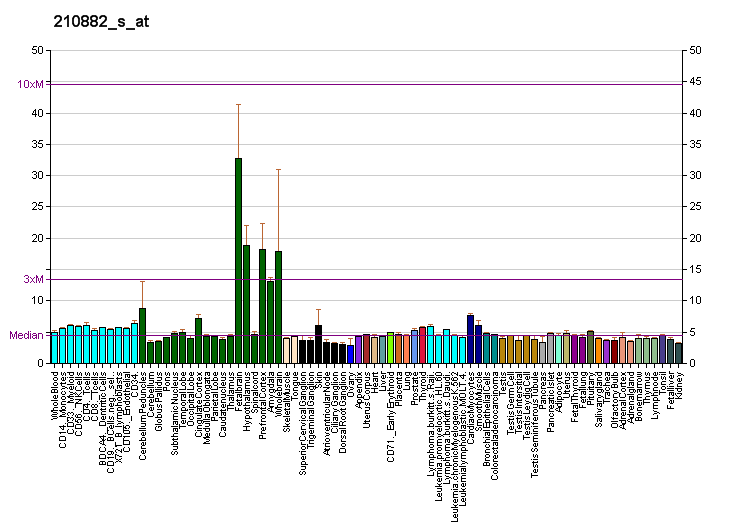

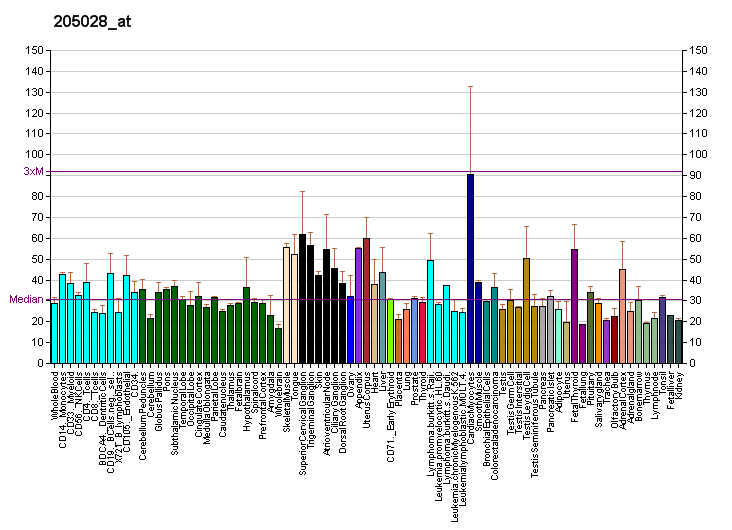
RNA expression pattern
Bgee	Human / Mouse (ortholog); Top expressed in: anterior pituitary; left ovary; tibia; right ovary; right frontal lobe; ganglionic eminence; middle temporal gyrus; frontal pole; canal of the cervix; Brodmann area 10 / Top expressed in: entorhinal cortex; perirhinal cortex; dorsomedial hypothalamic nucleus; CA3 field; nucleus of stria terminalis; paraventricular nucleus of hypothalamus; central gray substance of midbrain; arcuate nucleus; ventromedial nucleus; lateral septal nucleus; More reference expression data
BioGPS	More reference expression data
Gene ontology
Molecular function	protein binding
Cellular component	plasma membrane; integral component of plasma membrane; intrinsic component of plasma membrane
Biological process	cell adhesion; embryo implantation; homophilic cell adhesion via plasma membrane adhesion molecules
Sources:Amigo / QuickGO
Orthologs
Databases	NCBI: entry; OMA: entry
Species	Human	Mouse
Entrez	7216	56191
Ensembl	ENSG00000067445	ENSMUSG00000025272
UniProt	Q12816; Q9BX88	n/a
RefSeq (mRNA)	NM_001039705; NM_001271183; NM_001271184; NM_016157; NM_177556 NM_177557	NM_001002272; NM_001290770; NM_001290771; NM_001290772; NM_019548 NM_207679
RefSeq (protein)	NP_001034794; NP_001258112; NP_001258113; NP_057241; NP_808224 NP_808225; NP_808225.1	n/a
Location (UCSC)	Chr X: 54.92 – 54.93 Mb	Chr X: 149.43 – 149.44 Mb
PubMed search
- Wikidata
View/Edit Human	View/Edit Mouse

Trophinin is a protein that in humans is encoded by the TRO gene.

This gene encodes a membrane protein that mediates apical cell adhesion between trophoblastic cells and luminal epithelial cells of the endometrium and is implicated in the initial attachment during the process of embryo implantation. This gene is related to the MAGED gene family by sequence similarity and chromosome location. Multiple alternatively spliced transcript variants have been found for this gene; however, the full-length nature of some variants has not been defined.
