= Roton (disambiguation) =

Roton is the name of

- Roton, an excitation in superfluid Helium-4
- Roton (label), a Romanian record label
- Roton SSTO, the design for a single-stage-to-orbit vehicle that was developed at Rotary Rocket
