= Ross Bridge (disambiguation) =

Ross Bridge is a bridge in Tasmania, Australia.

Ross Bridge may also refer to

- Ross Bridge, Alabama, a neighborhood
- Ross Bridge, a swing bridge in Penzance, Cornwall, England
- Ross Bridge (North Yorkshire), a toll bridge in England

== See also ==
- Rossbridge, a town in Victoria, Australia
- Betsy Ross Bridge, a bridge between Philadelphia and New Jersey
- Ross Island Bridge, a bridge in Oregon
