= Emanuela Da Ros =

Italian writer

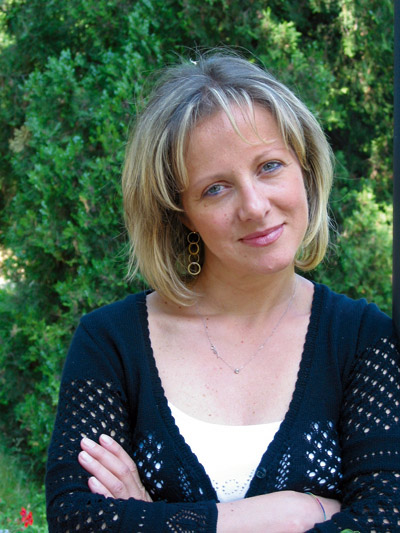

Emanuela Da Ros is a journalist and Italian writer of children's books.

She graduated in art history with a thesis on ancient Byzantine art at the University of Padua in 1985. Then she became an Italian teacher in a high-school in Vittorio Veneto. She started her writing activity in 2000, and she won the first prize at the International Children's Literature Award of Bologna, as the best unpublished Italian writer.

== Bibliography ==
- Poste e risposte, 2000
- Il giornalino Larry, 2001 (translated into German)
- I love school, 2002
- Lui è bellissimo!, 2004 (translated into Greek, German and Korean)
- Un cuoco da ragazzi, 2005
- Io voglio, 2007
- Avventure in cucina, 2008
- Ma Babbo Natale non ce l'ha il cellulare?, 2009
- Se, 2011
