= Rot (2019 film) =

- Directed by: Andrew Merrill
- Written by: Andrew Merrill
- Produced by: Beth Crudele
- Cinematography: Bogdan Yansen
- Release date: 2019
- Country: USA
- Language: English

Rot is a 2019 horror drama film directed by Andrew Merrill and starring Kris Alexandre.

== Plot ==
Madison breaks up with her boyfriend Jesse due to them wanting different things in life and feeling her studies are more important than a relationship. Later, Jesse is infected by an elderly woman with a rare rage virus while in the process of trying to propose to Madison. Once the infection begins to run its course, rage takes over Jesse's mind, turning him into a nightmare from hell.

== Cast ==
Actor	Role
Kris Alexandrea	Madison
Johnny Kostrey	Jesse
Johnny Uhorchuk	Aaron
Sara Young Chandler	Nora
Daniel Amerman	Malcom
Andre Bolourchi	Jogger
Matthew Brady	Grad Student
Adam Burch	Alex
McKale Jude Bingham	Chrissy
Tyrone Evans Clark	Student

== Production ==
The story was inspired by and compared to the films of director David Cronenberg.

The film was written, directed, and edited by Andrew Merrill. Merrill also served as executive producer of the film. Beth Crudele served as another producer on the film. Other production members included Bogdan Yansen as cinematographer, Josy Svajda as original music composer, Stephanie Ottinger as production designer, and Pamela Wilkinson as costume designer.

== Release ==
Rot was screened at the 16th annual - Another Hole in the Head Film Fest of December 2019 at New People Cinema in San Francisco. Around the year 2020 the film received a distribution deal with The Horror Collective.

The film was released via genre distributor The Horror Collective on November 19, 2020 exclusively through Amazon.

On July 20, 2021, the film was released on horror-genre Shudder platform.

== Reception ==
According to Deadline,“The Horror Collective’s mission is to uplift new and exciting voices, to help create the next generation of horror masters,” said Shaked Berenson, CEO of The Horror Collective parent company Entertainment Squad. “Rot is one of those movies that is a perfect example of the kind of people and content we want to work with and we’re proud to add to our slate.”

Terry Mesnard of Gayly Dreadful! wrote,"This is all interesting and well-done. Merrill created sympathetic characters and we spend a lot of time with them, building their relationships. Even the side characters like Aaron (Johnny Uhorchuk) and Nora (Sara Young Chandler) are given more depth than you’d expect. They also provide an interesting foil to Madison and Jesse, with their burgeoning relationship contrasting with Madison/Jesse’s rapidly deteriorating one."
