= Ross, Wisconsin (disambiguation) =

Ross in the U.S. state of Wisconsin may refer to:

- Ross, Wisconsin, a town
- Ross, Vernon County, Wisconsin, an unincorporated community
- Ross Crossing, Wisconsin, an unincorporated community
