= ROT =

The initialism ROT may refer to:

- The Refugee Olympic Team at the 2016 Summer Olympics
- Retroactive overtime
- ROT (aviation) (rate one turn), a standard turning rate for aircraft
- ROT13, rotation-based cipher in cryptography
- Rotorua Airport, New Zealand, IATA code
- TAROM, a Romanian airline, ICAO code
- Renewed Order of the Temple, French neo-Templar order

== See also ==
- Rot (disambiguation)
