= Rot (book) =

2025 book by Padraic X. Scanlan

Rot: An Imperial History of the Irish Famine is a 2025 book by historian Padraic X. Scanlan.

== Overview ==
The book examines the history of the Great Famine in Ireland from 1845 to 1852. Scanlan argues that its fundamental cause was the monopolisation of land in Ireland by a Protestant Anglophone elite that cared only to produce food that could be exported for profit, fuelled by the British government's refusal to intervene once the famine began (driven by a belief in free-market capitalism and anti-Irish prejudice).

== Critical reception ==
Kirkus Reviews called Rot a "fine history." In The New Yorker, literary critic Fintan O'Toole called it "dutiful, sober, and rigorously unemotional... a vigorous and engaging new study of the Irish famine." Darran Anderson of the Financial Times called the book "disturbing and insightful... timely then not just for its subject but its sobriety." In The Nation, author John Banville called the book "comprehensive, elegantly written, and heartbreaking... fascinating in the intricacy of the path it follows, or makes, through the complexities of mid-19th-century relations between Ireland and 'the mainland.'"

In Foreign Affairs, international affairs scholar Andrew Moravcsik wrote that the book makes its argument convincingly and that "the disaster holds lessons for a modern era of extreme pro-market ideology and rising inequality." In The Wall Street Journal, historian Crawford Gribben of Queen's University Belfast wrote, "Scanlan's haunting and terrible book is undoubtedly a history title of the year." In The Irish Times, historian Breandán Mac Suibhne of the University of Galway wrote, "there is much that is familiar in Rot, but everywhere Scanlan looks at the familiar in new and interesting ways."

In History Today, historian Jay Roszman of University College Cork gave the book a more mixed review, calling it "lucidly written and well-paced" but writing, "the simplicity of argument comes at a cost, eroding much of the complexity and contradictions of the Famine's occurrence."

Eoin O'Malley of The Irish Independent reviewed Rot unfavorably, calling Scanlan "a polemicist" whose "approach is to select evidence to back up his instincts, not subject those instincts to a test in which contrary evidence is brought to bear". O'Malley added, "Scanlan might think he is doing good work, but to jump on academic fads such as colonialism seems more like activism than scholarship", and criticised Scanlan for writing "for a North American audience".
