= Ross Island (disambiguation) =

Ross Island is an island in Antarctica.

Ross Island may also refer to:

- James Ross Island, near Antarctica
- Ross Island (Townsville, Queensland), Australia
- Ross Island (Oregon), in the Willamette River in Portland, Oregon, U.S.
- Ross Island (Pennsylvania), in the Allegheny River in Armstrong County, Pennsylvania, U.S.
- Rossøya or Ross Island, Norway
- Ross Island, South Andaman district, in the Andaman and Nicobar Islands in the Indian Ocean
- Ross Island, North and Middle Andaman district, in the Andaman and Nicobar Islands in the Indian Ocean
- Ross Island, Killarney, a lake island in south-west Ireland, site of the earliest Irish copper smelting
- Ross Island (New Brunswick), Canada
