= SuperSPARC =

Microprocessor developed by Sun Microsystems

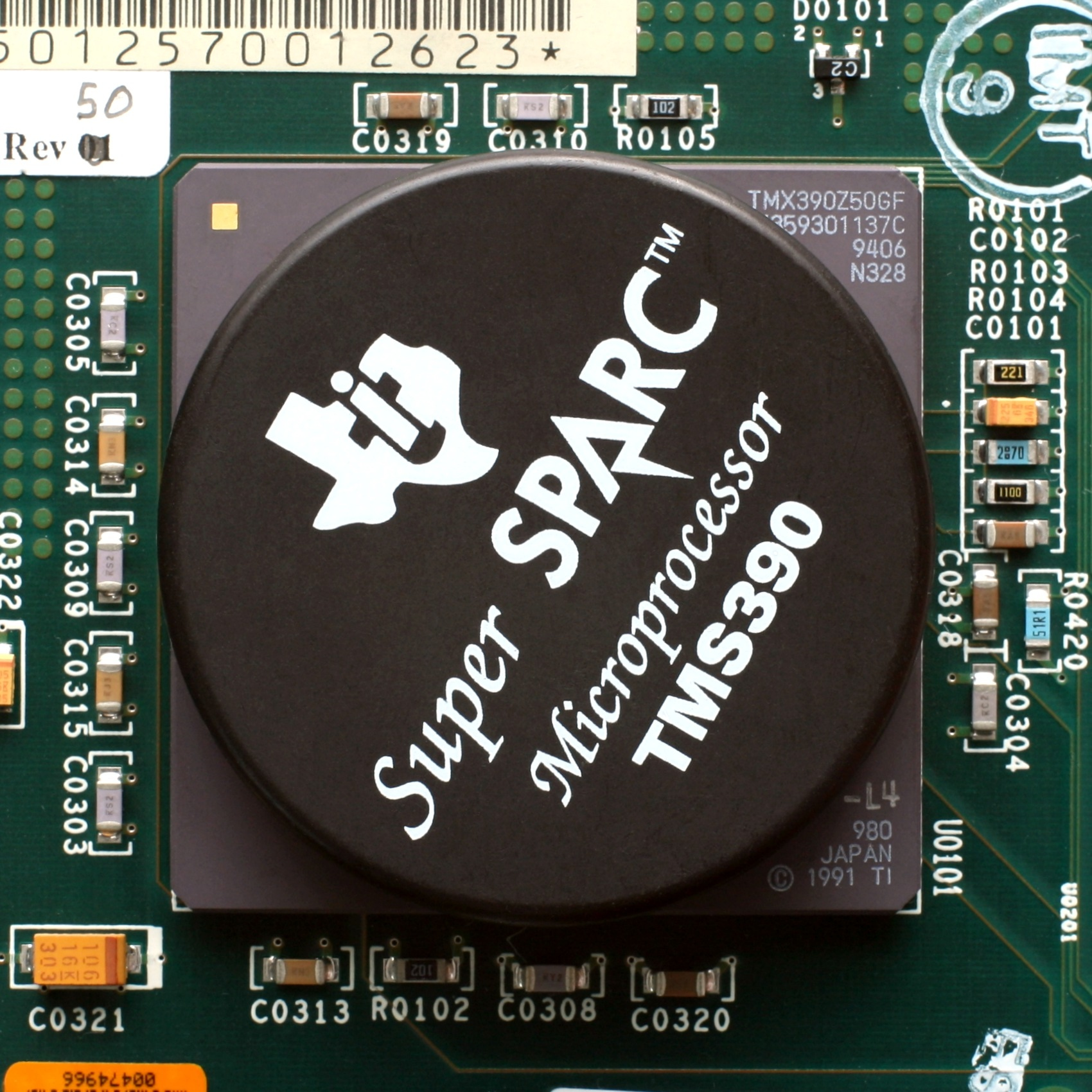
- The SuperSPARC microprocessor

General information
- Launched: 1992
- Discontinued: 1995
- Designed by: Sun Microsystems
- Common manufacturer: Texas Instruments

Performance
- Max. CPU clock rate: 33 MHz to 90 MHz

Physical specifications
- Transistors: 3.1 million
- Cores: 1

Cache
- L2 cache: none, 1 MB, 2 MB

Architecture and classification
- Instruction set: SPARC V8

The SuperSPARC is a microprocessor that implements the SPARC V8 instruction set architecture (ISA) developed by Sun Microsystems. 33 and 40 MHz versions were introduced in 1992. The SuperSPARC contains 3.1 million transistors. It was fabricated by Texas Instruments (TI) at Miho, Japan in a 0.8 micrometre triple-metal BiCMOS process.

There are two derivatives of the SuperSPARC: the SuperSPARC+ and SuperSPARC-II. The SuperSPARC+ was developed to remedy some of the design flaws that limited the SuperSPARC's clock frequency and thus performance. The SuperSPARC-II, introduced in 1994, was a major revision with improvements that enabled the microprocessor to reach 85 MHz in desktop systems and 90 MHz in the more heavily cooled SPARCserver-1000E.

SuperSPARC CPU modules are used in both the SPARCstation 10 and SPARCstation 20.

The SuperSPARC-II was replaced in 1995 by the 64-bit UltraSPARC, an implementation of the 64-bit SPARC V9 ISA.

== Models ==
=== SuperSPARC (Viking) ===
Model	CPU	L2 Cache	Clock Speed	Bus Speed	Notes
SM20	1 CPU	none	33 MHz	33 MHz	
SM21	1 CPU	1 MB	33 MHz	33 MHz	only works in early SPARCserver-2000 systems
SM30	1 CPU	none	36 MHz	36 MHz	
SM40	1 CPU	none	40 MHz	40 MHz	
SM41	1 CPU	1 MB	40.3 MHz	40 MHz	
SM50	1 CPU	none	50 MHz	50 MHz	
SM51	1 CPU	1 MB	50 MHz	40 MHz	
SM51-2	1 CPU	2 MB	50 MHz	40 MHz	
SM52	2 CPU	1 MB	45 MHz	40 MHz	
SM52X	2 CPU	1 MB	50 MHz	40 MHz	
SM61	1 CPU	1 MB	60 MHz	50/55 MHz	
SM61-2	1 CPU	2 MB	60 MHz	50/55 MHz	

=== SuperSPARC II (Voyager) ===
Model	CPU	L2 Cache	Clock Speed	Bus Speed	Notes
SM71	1 CPU	1 MB	75 MHz	50 MHz	
SM81	1 CPU	1 MB	85 MHz	50 MHz	
SM81-2	1 CPU	2 MB	85 MHz	50/55 MHz	
SM91-2	1 CPU	2 MB	90 MHz	50 MHz	

Die photos

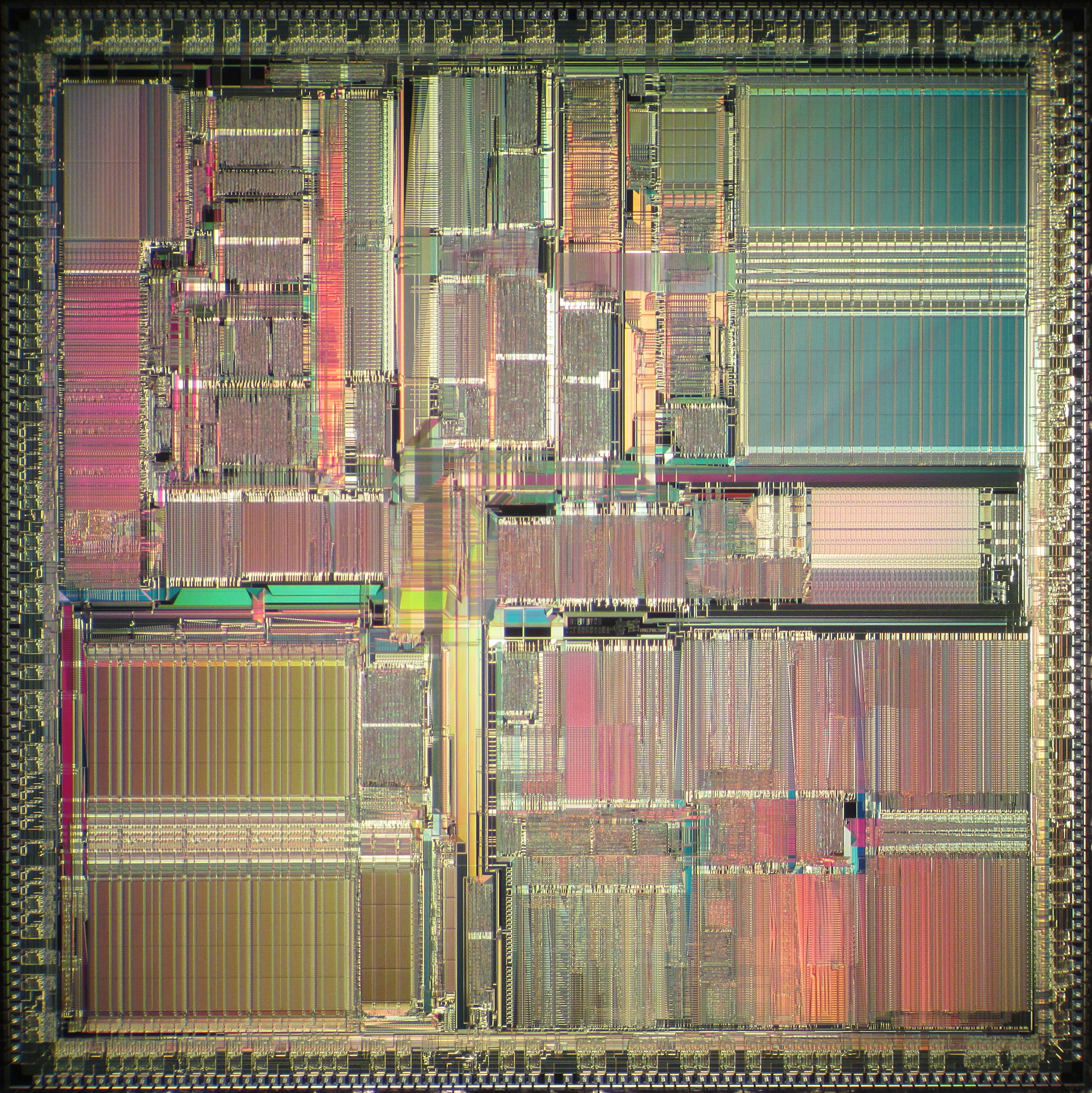
TI SuperSPARC I

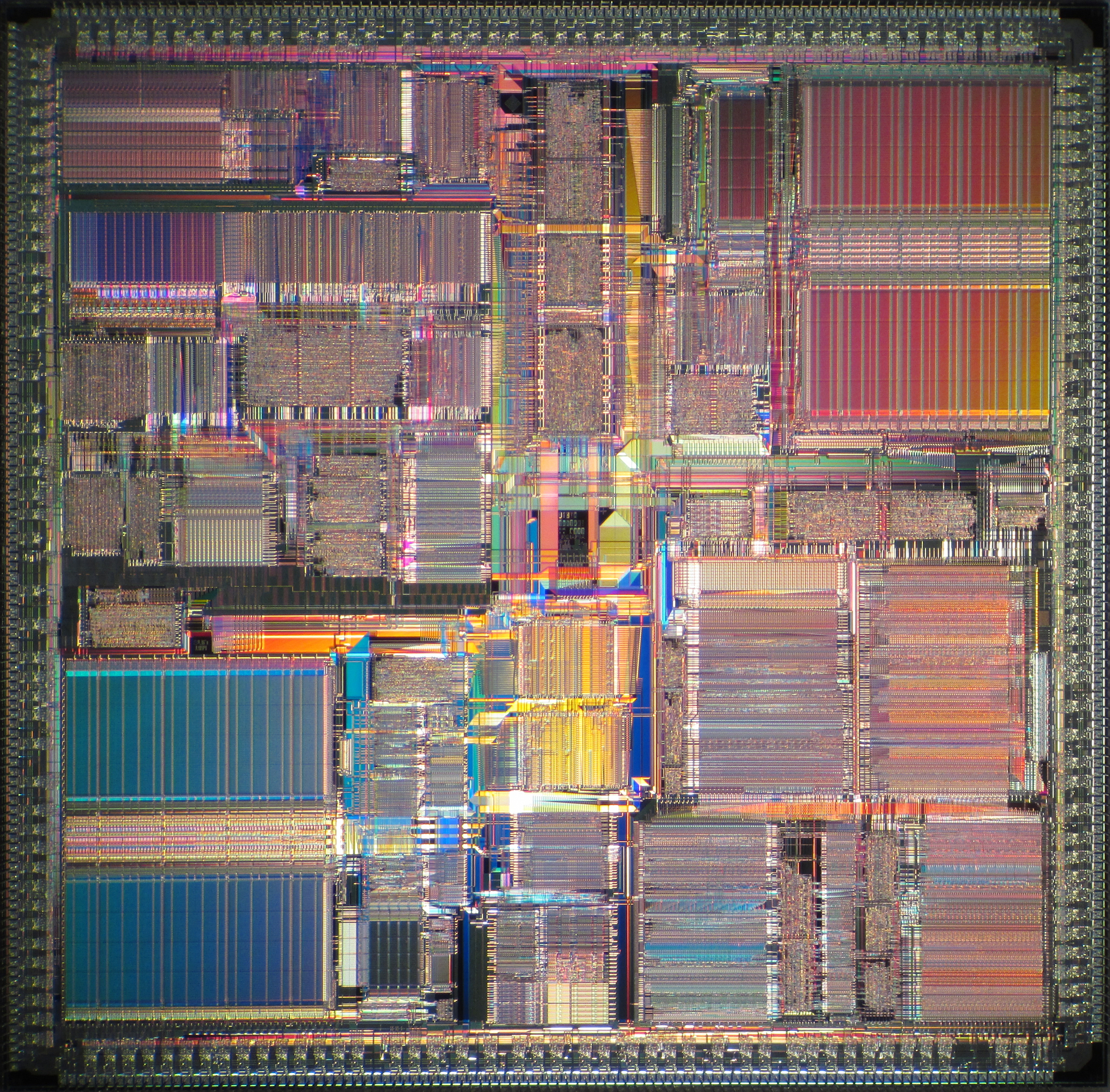
Sun SuperSPARC II

== See also ==
- SPARCstation 10
- SPARCstation 20
