= Ross Technology =

American semiconductor company

Ross Technology, Inc.
- Industry: Electronics
- Founded: August 1988; 37 years ago in Austin, Texas
- Founder: Dr. Roger D. Ross
- Defunct: 1998
- Fate: Assets and patents property of Fujitsu Ltd.
- Website: ross.com at the Wayback Machine (archived 1997-03-27)

Ross Technology, Inc. was a semiconductor design and manufacturing company, specializing in SPARC microprocessors. It was founded in Austin, Texas in August 1988 by Dr. Roger D. Ross, a leading computer scientist who headed Motorola's Advanced Microprocessor Division and directed the developments of Motorola's MC68030 and RISC-based 88000 microprocessor families.

Dr. Ross was accompanied by Carl Dobbs, Janet Sooch, Steve Goldstein and Travor Smith, who were from Motorola's High-end Microprocessor Division, and were involved in the development of the 88000 microprocessor. He was later joined by Am29000 engineer Raju Vegesna from AMD, who was originally hired by Dr. Ross at Motorola.

Cypress Semiconductor provided initial funding. Original board members included Dr. Ross and well-known figures as Dr. T. J. Rodgers of Cypress Semiconductor, John Doerr of Kleiner Perkins Venture Capital, and L. J. Sevin of Sevin Rosen Venture Capital, who also served as board chairman. Ross eventually became a subsidiary of Cypress.

== Lawsuits ==
In September 1988, the company was tied up in a lawsuit launched by Motorola. Motorola alleged that Ross and the other former Motorola staff had proprietary marketing material as well as all the 68000 and 88000 technical data, and sought a temporary injunction and $8 million in compensation and punitive damages. Motorola offered to settle the lawsuit without litigation if the former Motorola staff agreed not to work on modern computer architecture for 18 months. In late September 1988, Motorola withdrew the temporary injunction after former Motorola staff agreed not to compromise proprietary information regarding the 68000 and 88000 microprocessors. The lawsuit was settled in October.

In mid-October, after the lawsuit from Motorola was settled, AMD launched a lawsuit over the hiring of Raju Vegesna, who was involved in the design of the Am29000. It was settled in late October, with AMD getting limited rights to inspect Ross' RISC-related designs.

== Early products ==
Ross' first products were SPARC chip sets. On 23 April 1990, Cypress announced the CY7C611 a microprocessor developed by Ross for embedded applications. Later, Ross was tasked by Cypress to develop the Pinnacle microprocessor, a superscalar SPARC implementation intended to compete with the Sun Microsystems and Texas Instruments SuperSPARC. In May 1993, Pinnacle was revealed to be the hyperSPARC, and the microprocessor was announced in May 1993.

== After hyperSPARC ==
Cypress had bet the company's success on the hyperSPARC, threatening to abandon SPARC in favor of Digital Equipment Corporation's Alpha if Sun did not endorse the design. Although International Computers Limited and Meiko Scientific were claimed by Cypress to be major customers of hyperSPARC, the microprocessor was used in small quantities and by a handful of small vendors. Repeated delays in shipping the design, as a result of design and fabrication problems at Cypress contributed to the small number of users.

As the hyperSPARC had failed to win major customers, Cypress sold Ross to Fujitsu for $23 million on 12 May 1993. Fujitsu was interested in Ross for its hyperSPARC design, which it considered to be competitive. At the time, Fujitsu's SPARC business was limited to embedded designs after an unsuccessful attempt in the early 1990s to develop a high-end SPARC when the market for such designs was limited. After several government oversight committee hearings in Washington D.C., the sale was permitted to proceed. Under Fujitsu, the existing board of directors was replaced with its own members with the exception of Dr. Ross, who was named chairman.

The company was taken public by Robertson, Stephens & Company on 7 November 1995, but Fujitsu kept a controlling interest in the company and continued to control the board of directors. Sun Microsystems also took a 10% interest in the company and was allowed to name a director as well.

In February 1996, Ross Technology formed Ross Microcomputer in Sonoma, California to produce workstations and servers for value-added resellers (VARs) and original equipment manufacturers (OEMs). Their first product, the hyperStation, was known since the division's creation and was introduced in June 1996. The systems used hyperSPARC microprocessors.

In 1995, Sun Microsystems introduced the 64-bit UltraSPARC microprocessor. As Sun was the dominant SPARC vendor, the majority of the market followed and began the migration to 64-bit SPARC. As a result, the 32-bit SPARC market began to decline.

Ross did not have a 64-bit SPARC microprocessor and was at a disadvantage as a result. Combined with the creation of Ross Microcomputer earlier in the year, which incurred restructuring and other costs, it began to lose money. An effort to regain the company's competitiveness was active at the time, and it involved developing a new 64-bit microprocessor code-named Viper. Fujitsu provided the initial funding for the project, and also agreed to provide Ross Technology with a loan so it could continue operating.

The company's stock fell during this period, and there were several warnings from NASDAQ in 1997 that the company would be delisted, which Ross avoided until 1998, when the company's stock fell below NASDAQ requirements.

In April 1998, the company began to consider its financial options, including a search for a buyer. In May, the company warned that a closing of operations was coming and in June 1998, the board of directors decided to begin closing down the company after there were no buyers. A new business unit called BridgePoint was formed at this time to manage the existing inventory, to meet the requirements of existing customers and to provide support for Ross products. Ross Technology closed down in 1998 and all its assets and patents became the property of Fujitsu Ltd.

== Legacy ==
Ross was a significant part of the hardware ecosystem of Sun's SPARC-based systems of the time. They participated in the design of the MBus architecture, and it was Ross Technology's 605-based Pinnacle product line that launched Sun servers into the 2x and 4x multi-processor arena which prior to Ross were confined to single processor server offerings.

The hyperSPARC processor developed by Ross, viewed first as a competitor to Sun's own SPARC processor designs, but eventually adopted by Sun and sold both as upgrades and system components. It was an emergency engineering-wide Ross hyperSPARC upgrade which enabled Steve Jobs' Pixar to complete and deliver its animated movie Toy Story to Disney on schedule after the existing Sun Microsystems machines were overwhelmed in the late product development stage by Pixar's demanding new technology.

== See also ==
- Weitek Corporation
