= NeXTcube Turbo =

High-end workstation computer by NeXT

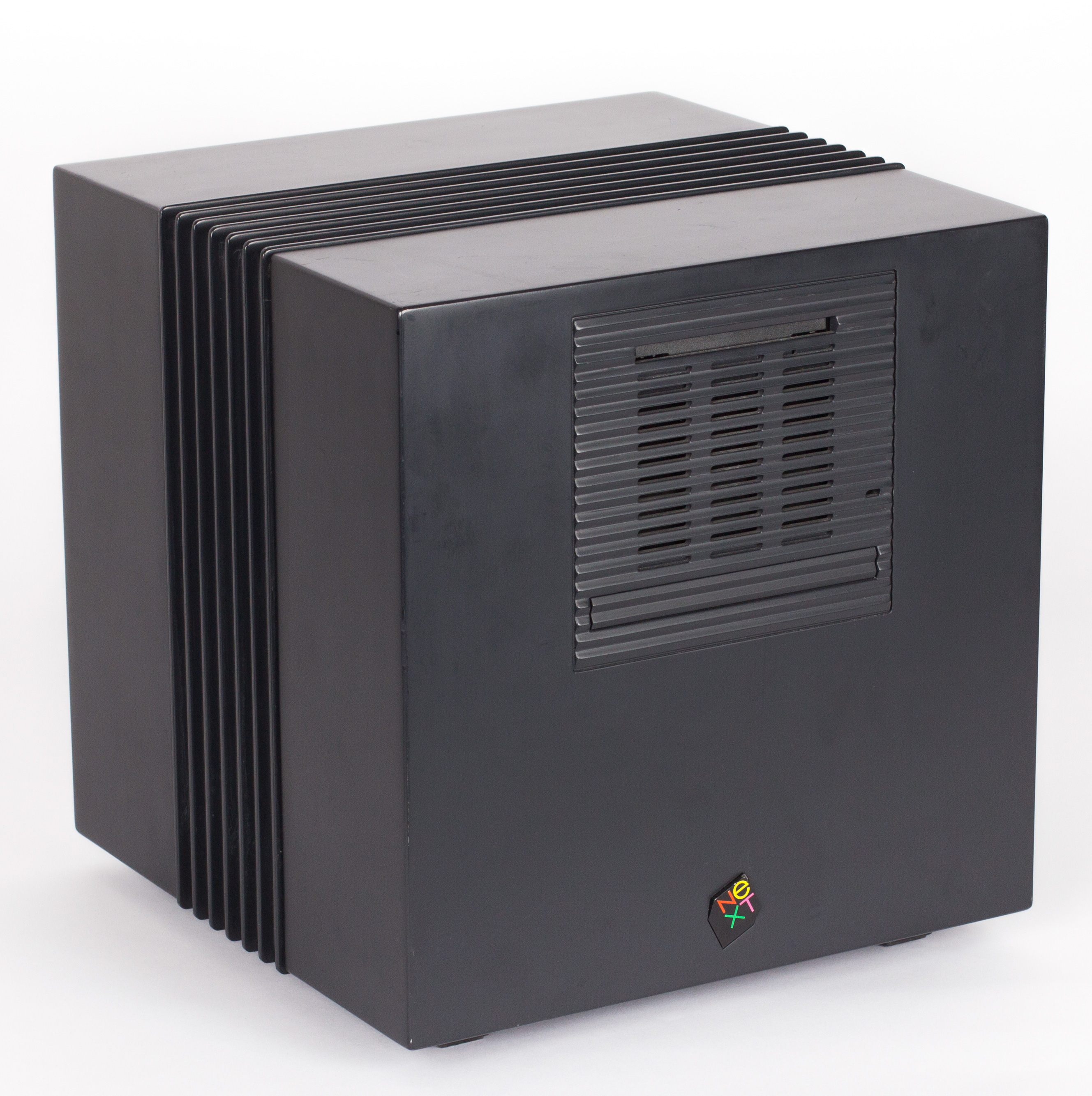
- Manufacturer: NeXT
- Type: Workstation
- Released: April 7, 1992; 34 years ago
- Discontinued: 1995
- Operating system: NeXTSTEP, OPENSTEP, NetBSD (limited support)
- CPU: Motorola 68040 @ 33 MHz, 56001 digital signal processor (DSP)
- Memory: 16–128 MB
- Display: 1120×832 2-bpp grayscale
- Dimensions: 1-foot (305 mm) die-cast magnesium cube-shaped case
- Predecessor: NeXTcube

The NeXTcube Turbo is a high-end workstation computer developed, manufactured and sold by NeXT. It superseded the earlier NeXTcube workstation and is housed in the same cube-shaped magnesium enclosure. It runs the NeXTSTEP operating system.

== Hardware ==
The NeXTcube Turbo is a development of the earlier NeXTcube. It differs from its predecessor in having a 33 MHz 68040 processor.

The NeXTdimension board can also be used in the NeXTcube Turbo.

There was also a very rare accelerator board known as the Nitro; between 5 and 20 are estimated to have been made. It increased the speed of a NeXTcube Turbo by replacing the standard 33 MHz processor with a 40 MHz one.

== Specifications ==
- Display: 1120×832 17" grayscale MegaPixel Display
- Operating system: NeXTSTEP, OPENSTEP
- CPU: 33 MHz 68040 with integrated floating-point unit
- Digital signal processor: 25 MHz Motorola DSP56001
- RAM: 16 MB, expandable to 128 MB (Four 72-pin SIMM slots)
- Floppy Drive: 2.88 MB (optional)
- Hard Drive: 400 MB, 1.4 GB or 2.8 GB SCSI drive
- Expansion: four NeXTbus slots (mainboard uses one slot)
- Size (H × W × D): 12" × 12" × 12"

== See also ==
- NeXT Computer
- NeXTstation
- NeXT character set
- Power Mac G4 Cube
