= Desktop computer =

Computer designed to be used at a fixed location

A desktop computer system. It has a monitor, keyboard, mouse, speakers, and a computer tower. The computer tower contains the motherboard and processor.

A desktop computer, often abbreviated as desktop, is a personal computer designed for regular use at a stationary location on or near a desk (as opposed to a portable computer) due to its size and power requirements. The most common configuration has a case that houses the power supply, motherboard (a printed circuit board with a microprocessor as the central processing unit, memory, bus, certain peripherals and other electronic components), disk storage (usually one or more hard disk drives, solid-state drives, hybrid drives, optical disc drives, and in early models floppy disk drives); a keyboard and mouse for input; and a monitor, speakers, and, often, a printer for output. The case may be oriented horizontally or vertically and placed either underneath, beside, or on top of a desk.

Desktop computers with their cases oriented vertically are referred to as towers. As the majority of cases offered since the mid 1990s are in this form factor, the term desktop has been retronymically used to refer to modern cases offered in the traditional horizontal orientation.

== History ==
=== Origins ===
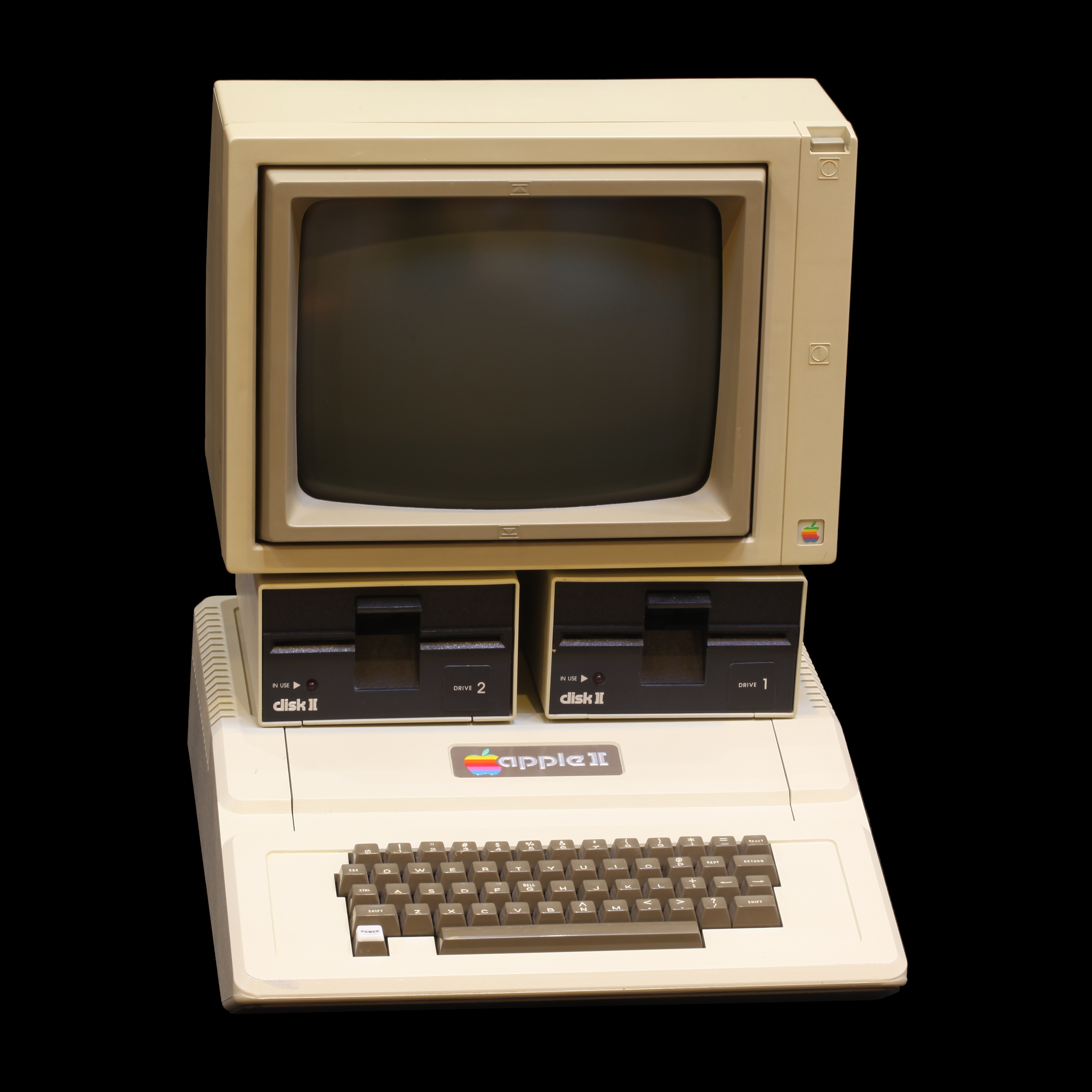
Apple II computer

Prior to the widespread use of microprocessors, a computer that could fit on a desk was considered remarkably small; the type of computers most commonly used were minicomputers, which, despite the name, were rather large and were "mini" only compared to the so-called "big iron". Early computers, and later the general purpose high throughput "mainframes", took up the space of a whole room. Minicomputers, on the contrary, generally fit into one or a few refrigerator-sized racks, or, for the few smaller ones, were built into a fairly large desk, not put on top of it.

It was not until the 1970s when fully programmable computers appeared that could fit entirely on top of a desk. 1970 saw the introduction of the Datapoint 2200, a "smart" computer terminal complete with keyboard and monitor, was designed to connect with a mainframe computer but that did not stop owners from using its built-in computational abilities as a stand-alone desktop computer. The HP 9800 series, which started out as programmable calculators in 1971 but was programmable in BASIC by 1972, used a smaller version of a minicomputer design based on ROM memory and had small one-line LED alphanumeric displays and displayed graphics with a plotter. The Wang 2200 of 1973 had a full-size cathode-ray tube (CRT) and cassette tape storage. The IBM 5100 in 1975 had a small CRT display and could be programmed in BASIC and APL. These were generally expensive specialized computers sold for business or scientific uses.

=== Growth and development ===
Apple II, TRS-80 and Commodore PET were first-generation personal home computers launched in 1977, which were aimed at the consumer market – rather than businessmen or computer hobbyists. Byte magazine referred to these three as the "1977 Trinity" of personal computing. Throughout the 1980s and 1990s, desktop computers became the predominant type, the most popular being the IBM PC and its clones, followed by the Apple Macintosh, with the third-placed Commodore Amiga having some success in the mid-1980s but declining by the early 1990s.

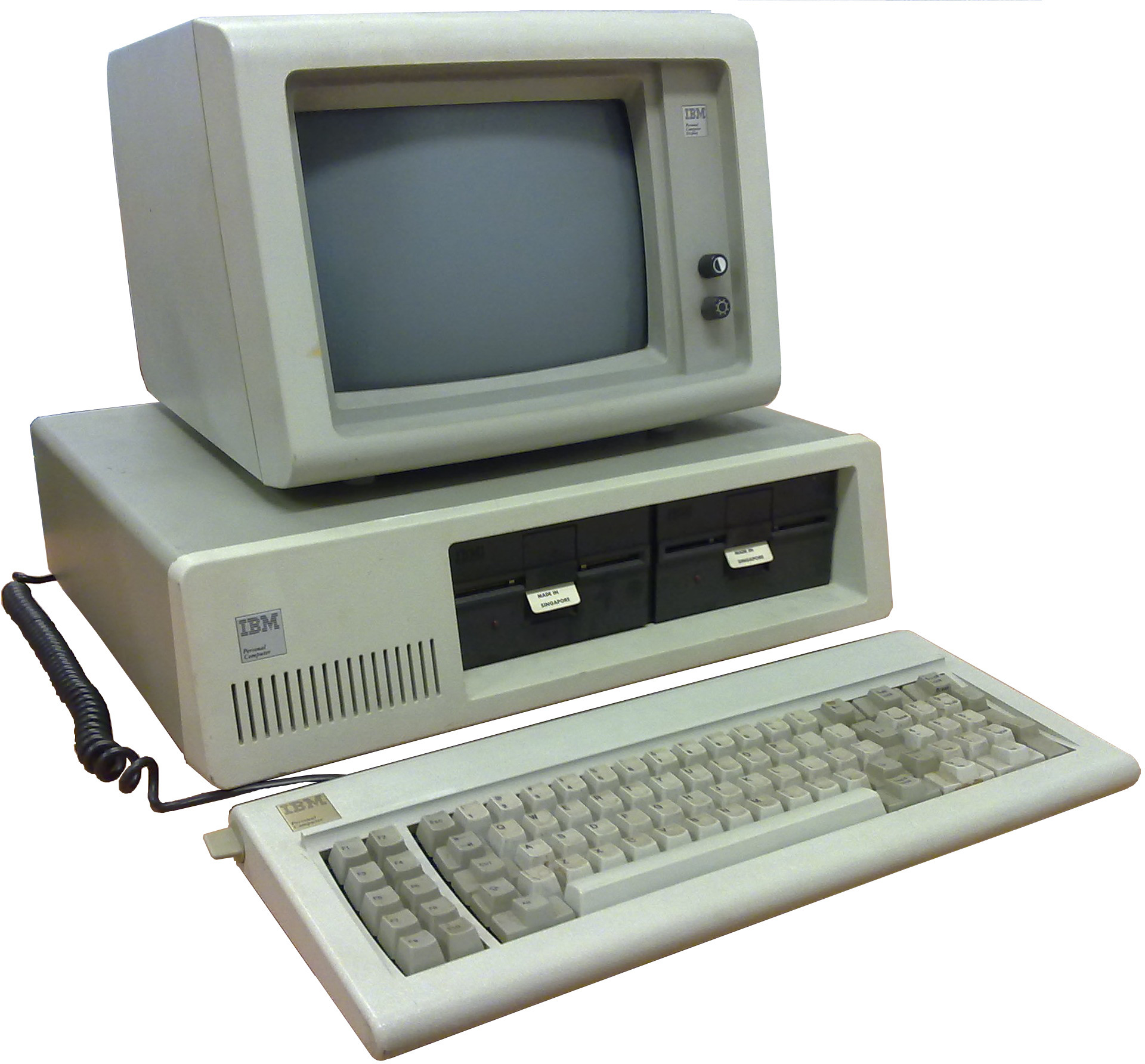
IBM 5150 Personal Computer

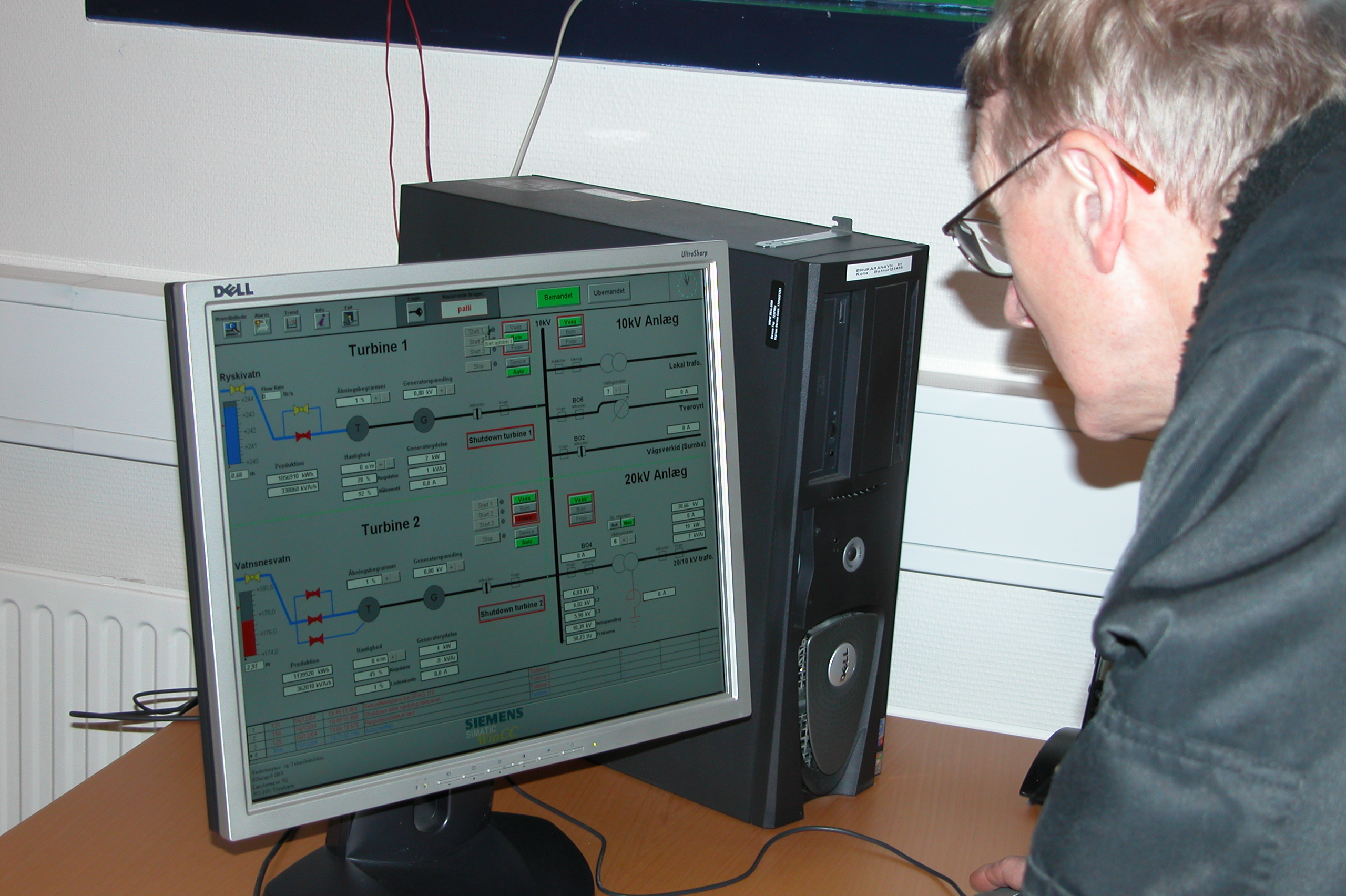
A person working on a 2004 tower PC with a Dell monitor

Early personal computers, like the original IBM Personal Computer, were enclosed in a "desktop case", horizontally oriented to have the display screen placed on top, thus saving space on the user's actual desk, although these cases had to be sturdy enough to support the weight of CRT displays that were widespread at the time. Over the course of the 1990s, desktop cases gradually became less common than the more-accessible tower cases that may be located on the floor under or beside a desk rather than on a desk. Not only do these tower cases have more room for expansion, they have also freed up desk space for monitors which were becoming larger every year. Desktop cases, particularly the compact form factors, remain popular for corporate computing environments and kiosks. Some computer cases can be interchangeably positioned either horizontally (desktop) or upright (mini-tower).

Influential games such as Doom and Quake during the 1990s had pushed gamers and enthusiasts to frequently upgrade to the latest CPUs and graphics cards (3dfx, ATI, and Nvidia) for their desktops (usually a tower case) in order to run these applications, though this has slowed since the late 2000s as the growing popularity of Intel integrated graphics forced game developers to scale back. Creative Technology's Sound Blaster series were a de facto standard for sound cards in desktop PCs during the 1990s until the early 2000s, when they were reduced to a niche product, as OEM desktop PCs came with sound boards integrated directly onto the motherboard.

=== Decline ===
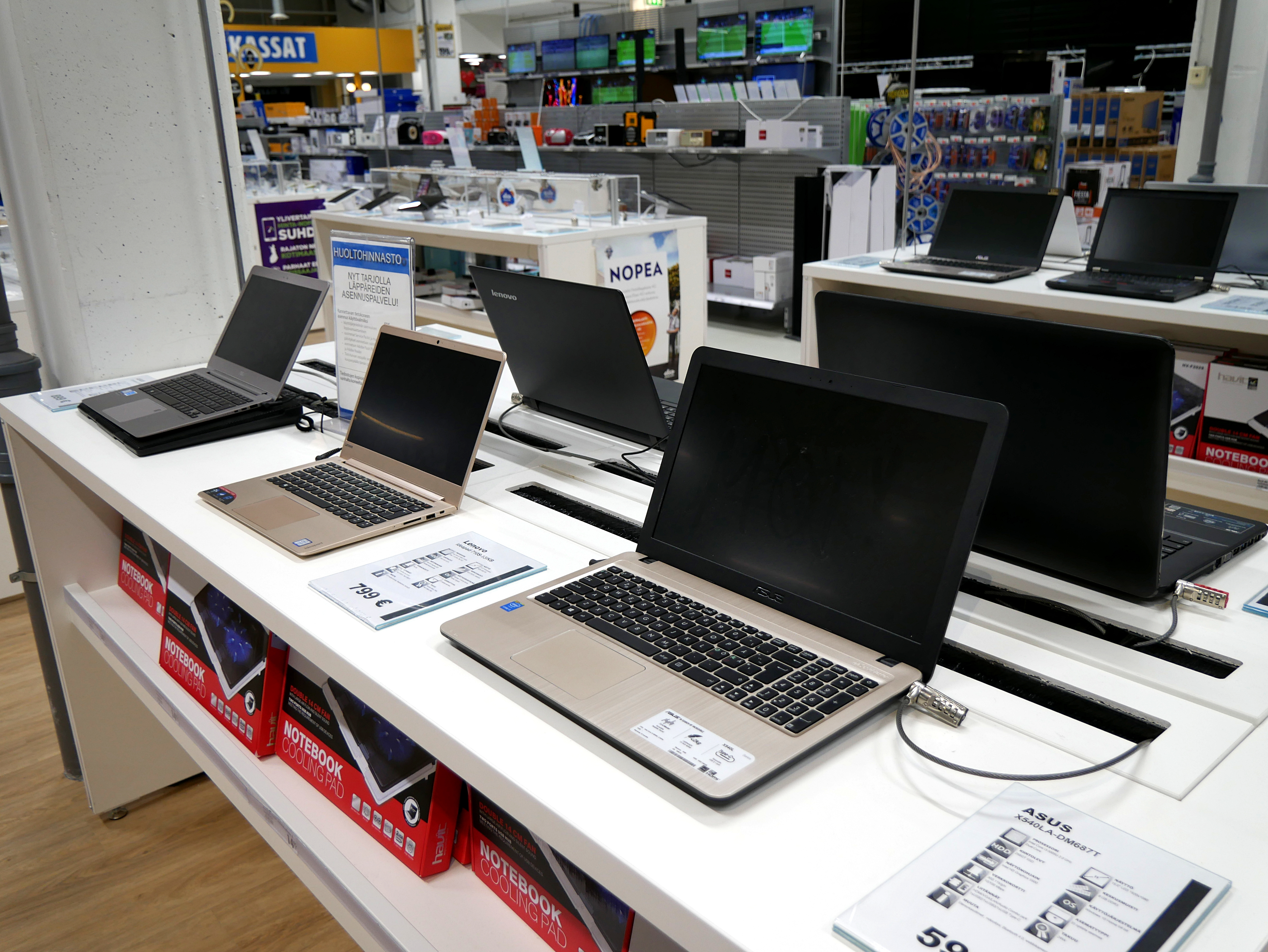
Laptops in store

While desktops used to be the most common configuration for PCs, by the mid-2000s the growth shifted from desktops to laptops. Laptops had long been produced by contract manufacturers based in Asia, such as Foxconn, and this shift led to the closure of the many desktop assembly plants in the United States by 2010. Another trend around this time was the increasing proportion of inexpensive base-configuration desktops being sold, hurting PC manufacturers such as Dell whose build-to-order customization of desktops relied on upselling added features to buyers.

Battery-powered portable computers had just a 2% worldwide market share in 1986. However, laptops have become increasingly popular, both for business and personal use. Around 109 million notebook PCs shipped worldwide in 2007, a growth of 33% compared to 2006. In 2008, it was estimated that 145.9 million notebooks were sold and that the number would grow in 2009 to 177.7 million. The third quarter of 2008 was the first time when worldwide notebook PC shipments exceeded desktops, with 38.6 million units versus 38.5 million units.

The sales breakdown of the Apple Macintosh has seen sales of desktop Macs staying mostly constant while being surpassed by that of Mac notebooks whose sales rate has grown considerably; seven out of ten Macs sold were laptops in 2009, a ratio projected to rise to three out of four by 2010. The change in sales of form factors is due to the desktop iMac moving from affordable G3 to upscale G4 model and subsequent releases are considered premium all-in-ones. By contrast, the MSRP of the MacBook laptop lines have dropped through successive generations such that the MacBook Air and MacBook Pro constitute the lowest price of entry to a Mac, with the exception of the even more inexpensive Mac Mini (albeit without a monitor and keyboard), and the MacBooks are the top-selling form factors of the Macintosh platform today.

The decades of development mean that most people already own desktop computers that meet their needs and have no need of buying a new one merely to keep pace with advancing technology. Notably, the successive release of new versions of Windows (Windows 95, 98, XP, Vista, 7, 8, 10 and so on) had been drivers for the replacement of PCs in the 1990s, but this slowed in the 2000s. IDC analyst Jay Chou suggested that Windows 8 actually hurt sales of PCs in 2012, as businesses decided to stick with Windows 7 rather than upgrade. Some suggested that Microsoft had acknowledged "implicitly ringing the desktop PC death knell" as Windows 8 offered little upgrade in desktop PC functionality over Windows 7; instead, Windows 8's innovations were mostly on the mobile side.

The post-PC trend saw a decline in the sales of desktop and laptop PCs. The decline was attributed to increased power and applications of alternative computing devices, namely smartphones and tablet computers. Although most people exclusively use their smartphones and tablets for more basic tasks such as social media and casual gaming, these devices have in many instances replaced a second or third PC in the household that would have performed these tasks, though most families still retain a powerful PC for serious work.

Among PC form factors, desktops remain a staple in the enterprise market but lost popularity among home buyers. PC makers and electronics retailers responded by investing their engineering and marketing resources towards laptops (initially netbooks in the late 2000s, and then the higher-performance Ultrabooks from 2011 onwards), which manufacturers believed had more potential to revive the PC market than desktops.

In April 2017, StatCounter declared a "Milestone in technology history and end of an era" with the mobile Android operating system becoming more popular than Windows (the operating system that made desktops dominant over mainframe computers). Windows is still most popular on desktops (and laptops), while smartphones (and tablets) use Android or iOS.

=== Resurgence ===
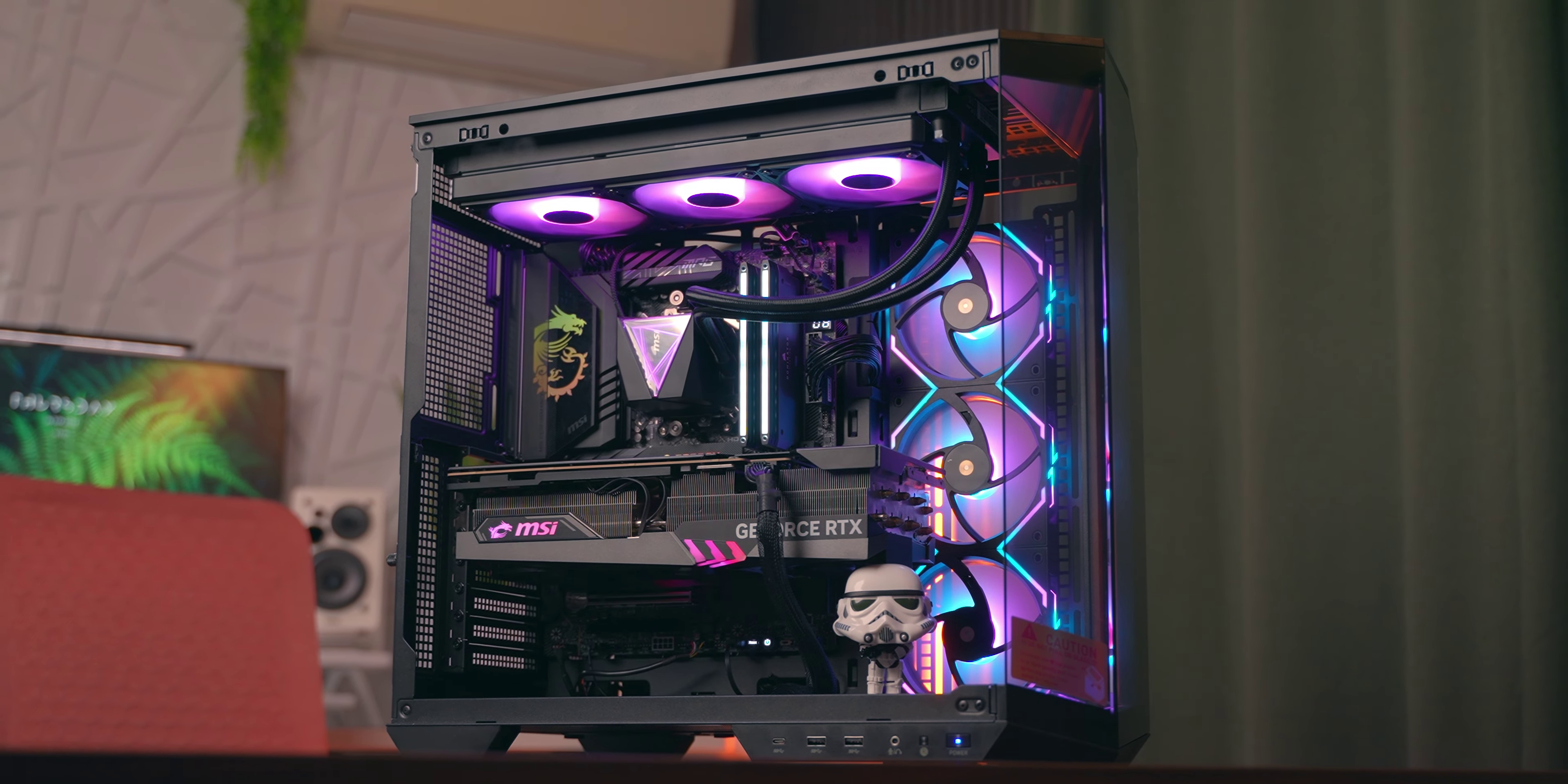
An MSI gaming desktop computer from the 2020s

Towards the middle of the 2010s, media sources began to question the existence of the post-PC trend, at least as conventionally defined, stating that the so-called post-PC devices are just other portable forms of PCs joining traditional desktop PCs which still have their own operation areas and evolve.

Although for casual use traditional desktops and laptops have seen a decline in sales, in 2018, global PC sales experienced a resurgence, driven by the business market. Desktops remain a solid fixture in the commercial and educational sectors. In 2019 the global PC market recorded its first full year of growth in eight years. Inclusive of desktops, notebooks and workstations, 268.1 million units were shipped, up 2.7% on 2018. According to the International Data Corporation (IDC), PC sales shot up 14.8% between 2020 and 2021 and desktop market grew faster than the laptop market in the second quarter of 2021. Total PC shipments during 2021 reached 348.8 million units, up 14.8% from 2020. This represents the highest level of shipments the PC market has seen since 2012. In addition, gaming desktops have seen a global revenue increase of 54% annually. For gaming the global market of gaming desktops, laptops, and monitors was expected to grow to 61.1 million shipments by the end of 2023, up from 42.1 million, with desktops growing from 15.1 million shipments to 19 million. PC gaming as a whole accounts for 28% of the total gaming market as of 2017. This is partially due to the increasing affordability of desktop PCs. In 2024 255.5 million PCs (including desktops and laptops) were shipped, up from 246 million in 2023 – a 3.8% year-over-year growth with Lenovo maintaining the largest market share.

== Types ==
=== By size ===
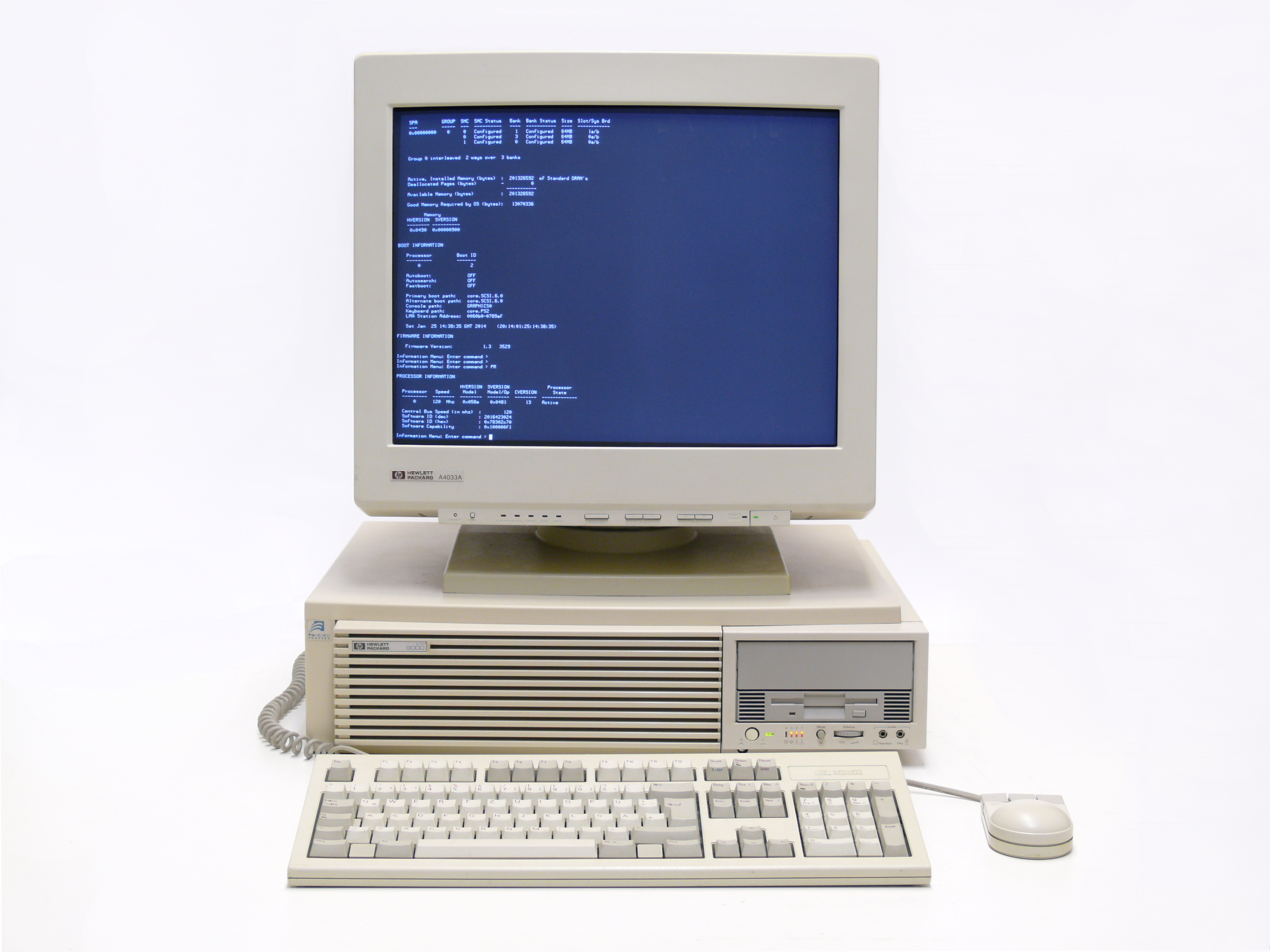
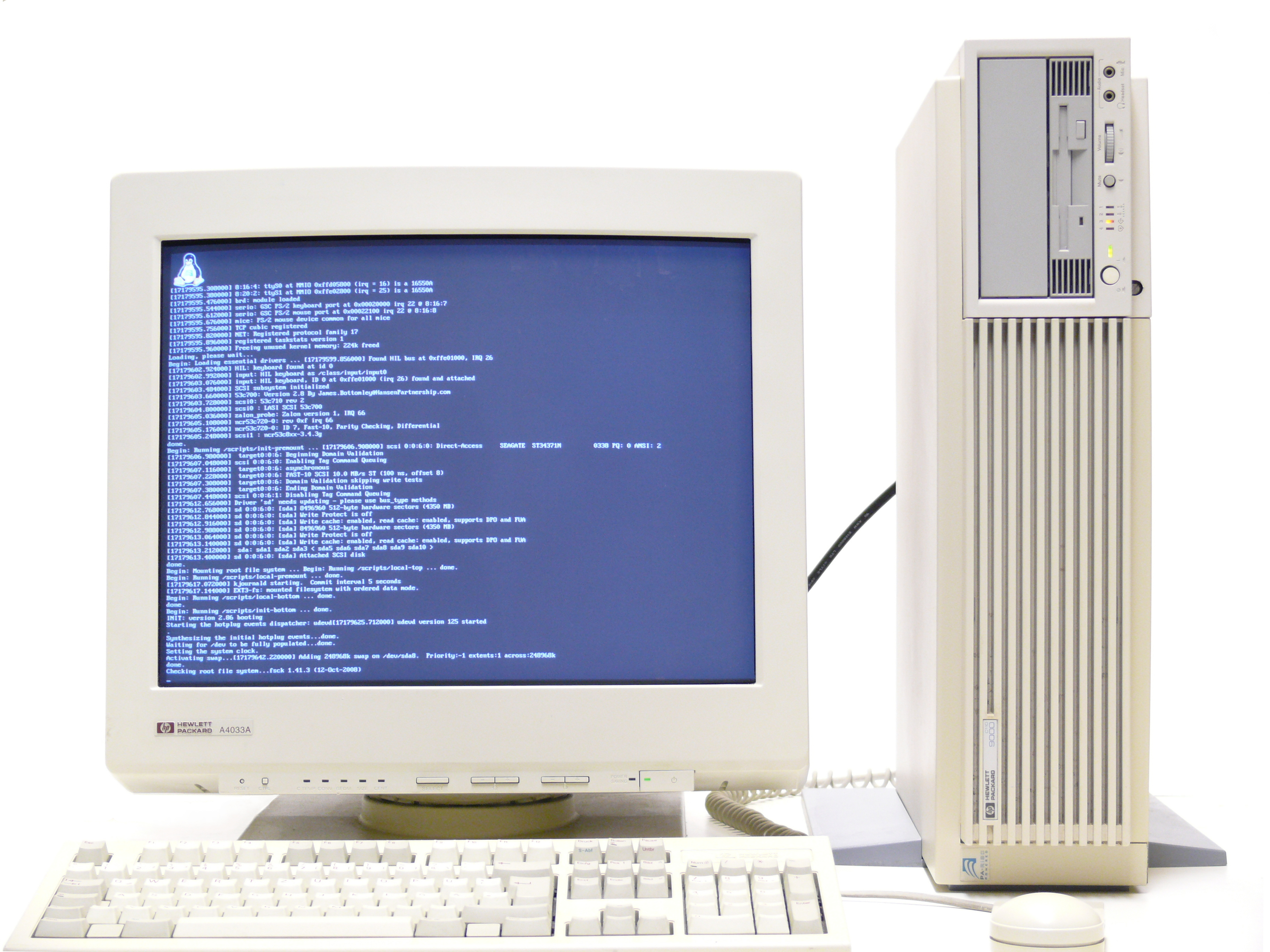
An HP 9000 workstation oriented as both a desktop (left) and as a tower (both). Optional plastic feet (pictured bottom right) allow the workstation to be held sturdily upright in the tower configuration.

==== Full-size ====
Full-sized desktops are characterized by separate display and processing components. These components are connected to each other by cables or wireless connections. They often come in a tower form factor. These computers are easy to customize and upgrade per user requirements, e.g. by expansion card.

Early extended-size (significantly larger than mainstream ATX case) tower computers sometimes were labeled as "deskside computers", but currently this naming is quite rare.

==== Compact ====
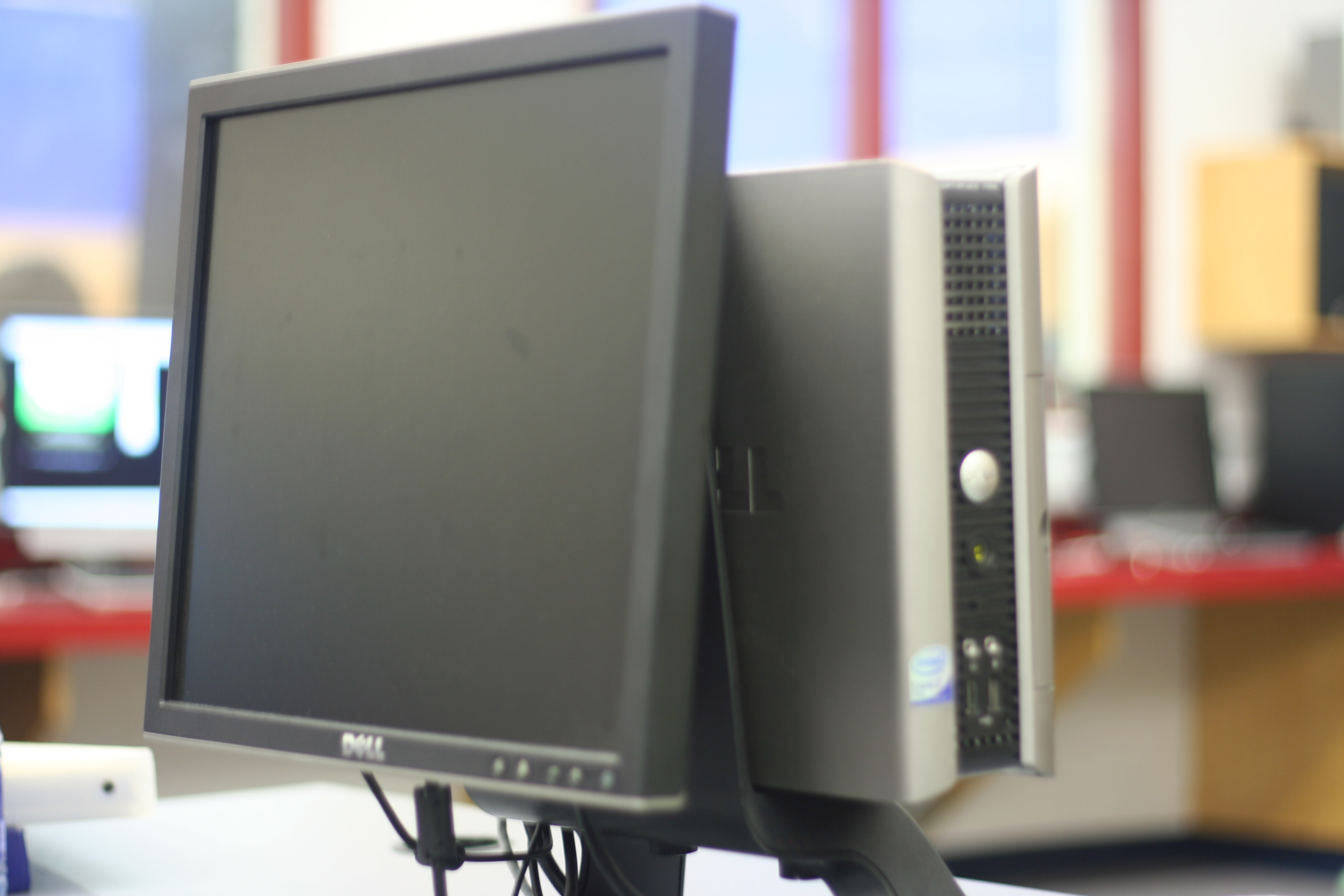
A compact desktop can be used similarly to an all-in-one computer.

Compact desktops are reduced in physical proportions compared to full-sized desktops. They are typically small-sized, inexpensive, low-power computers designed for basic tasks such as web browsing, accessing web-based applications, document processing, and audio/video playback. Hardware specifications and processing power are usually reduced and hence make them less appropriate for running complex or resource-intensive applications. A nettop is a notable example of a compact desktop. A laptop without a screen can functionally be used as a compact desktop, sometimes called a "slabtop".

=== Form factor ===
==== All-in-one ====
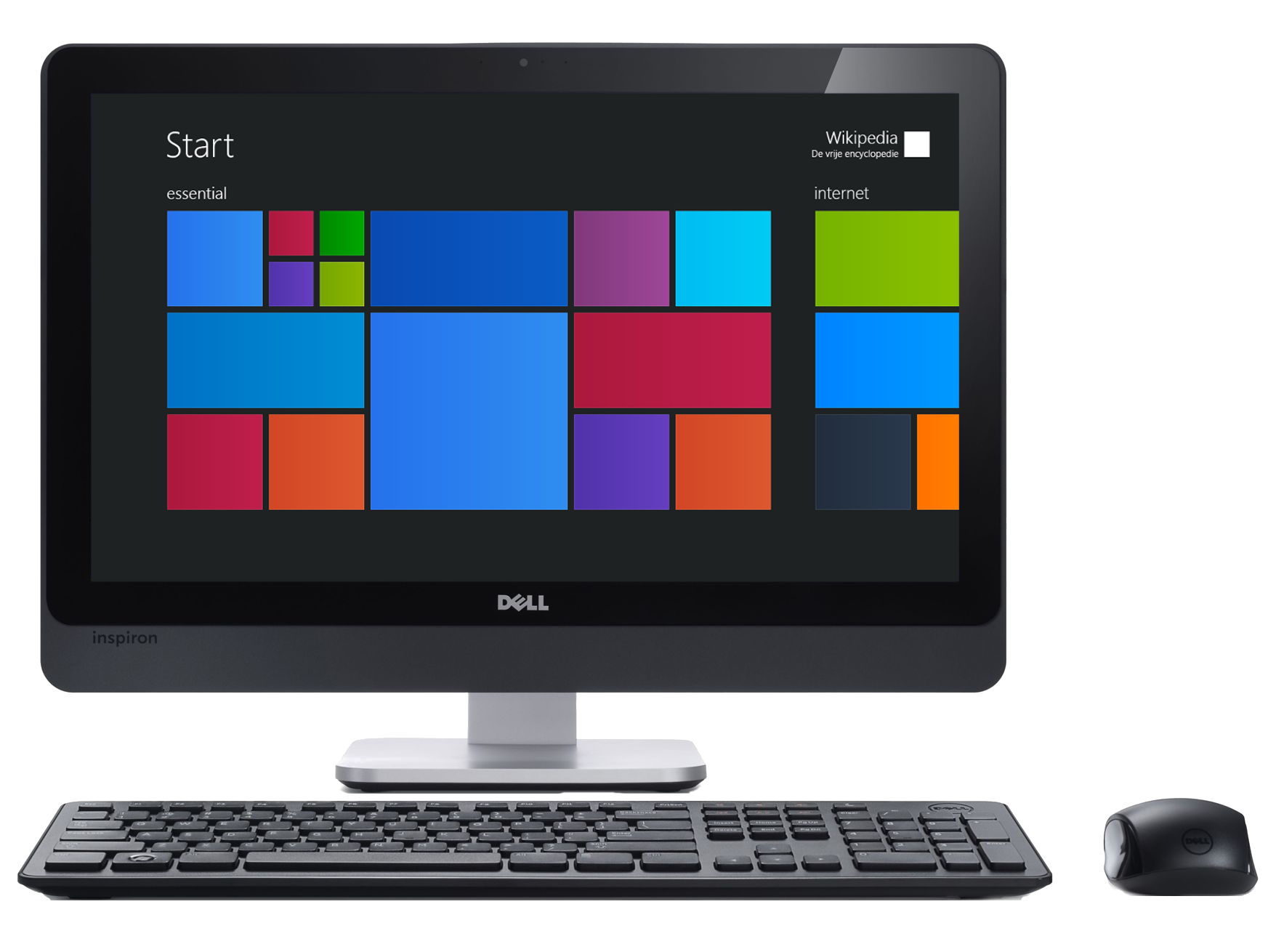
Dell Inspiron One 23 Touch as an example of an AIO desktop PC

An all-in-one (AIO) desktop computer integrates the system's internal components into the same case as the display, thus occupying a smaller footprint (with fewer cables) than desktops that incorporate a tower. The All-in-one systems are rarely labeled as desktop computers.

==== Tower ====
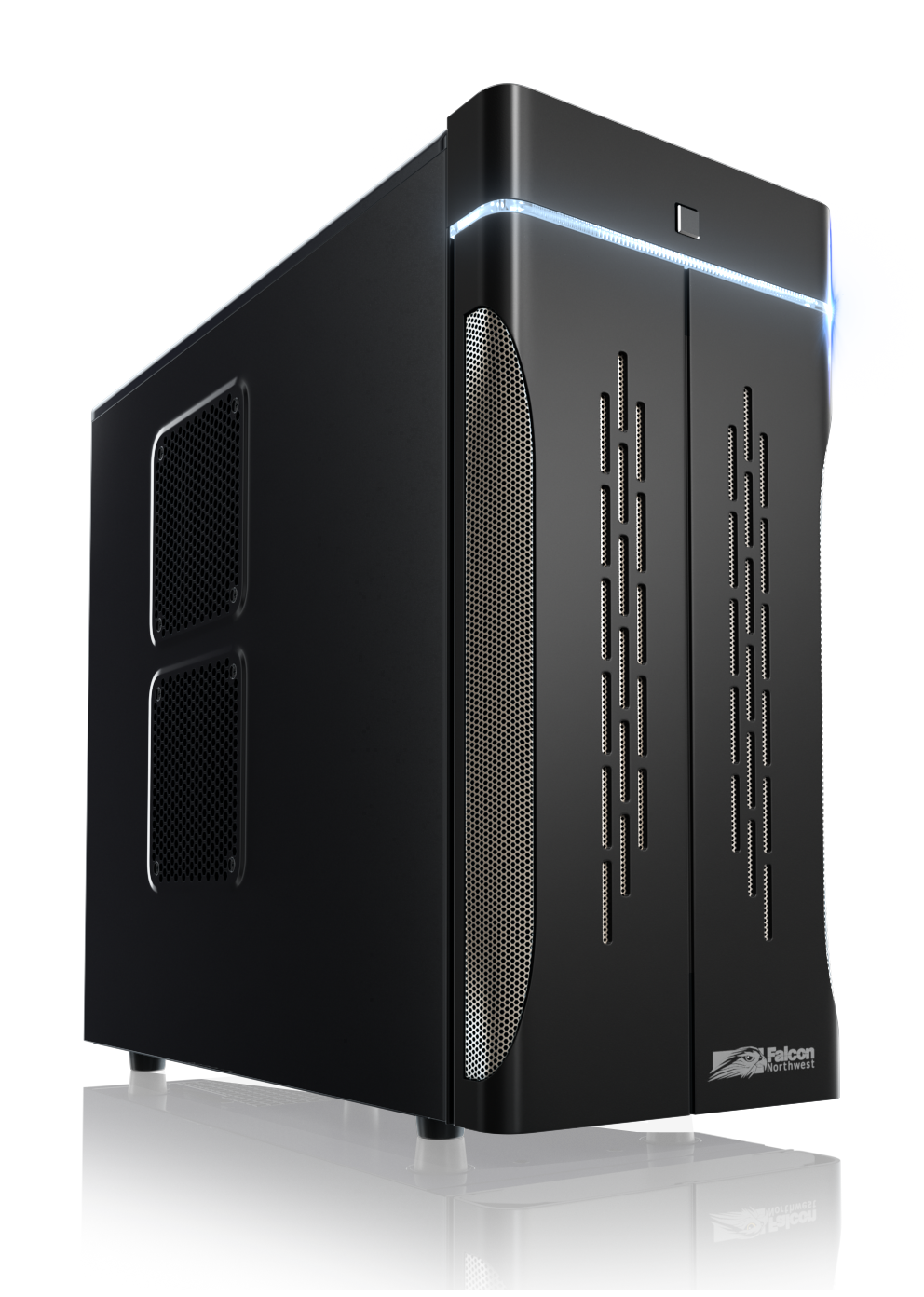
A mid-tower computer case c. 2011

In personal computing, a tower is a form factor of desktop computer case whose height is much greater than its width, thus having the appearance of an upstanding tower block.

==== Pizza box form factor ====
In computing, a pizza box enclosure is a design for desktop computers. Pizza box cases tend to be wide and flat, resembling pizza delivery boxes, hence the name.

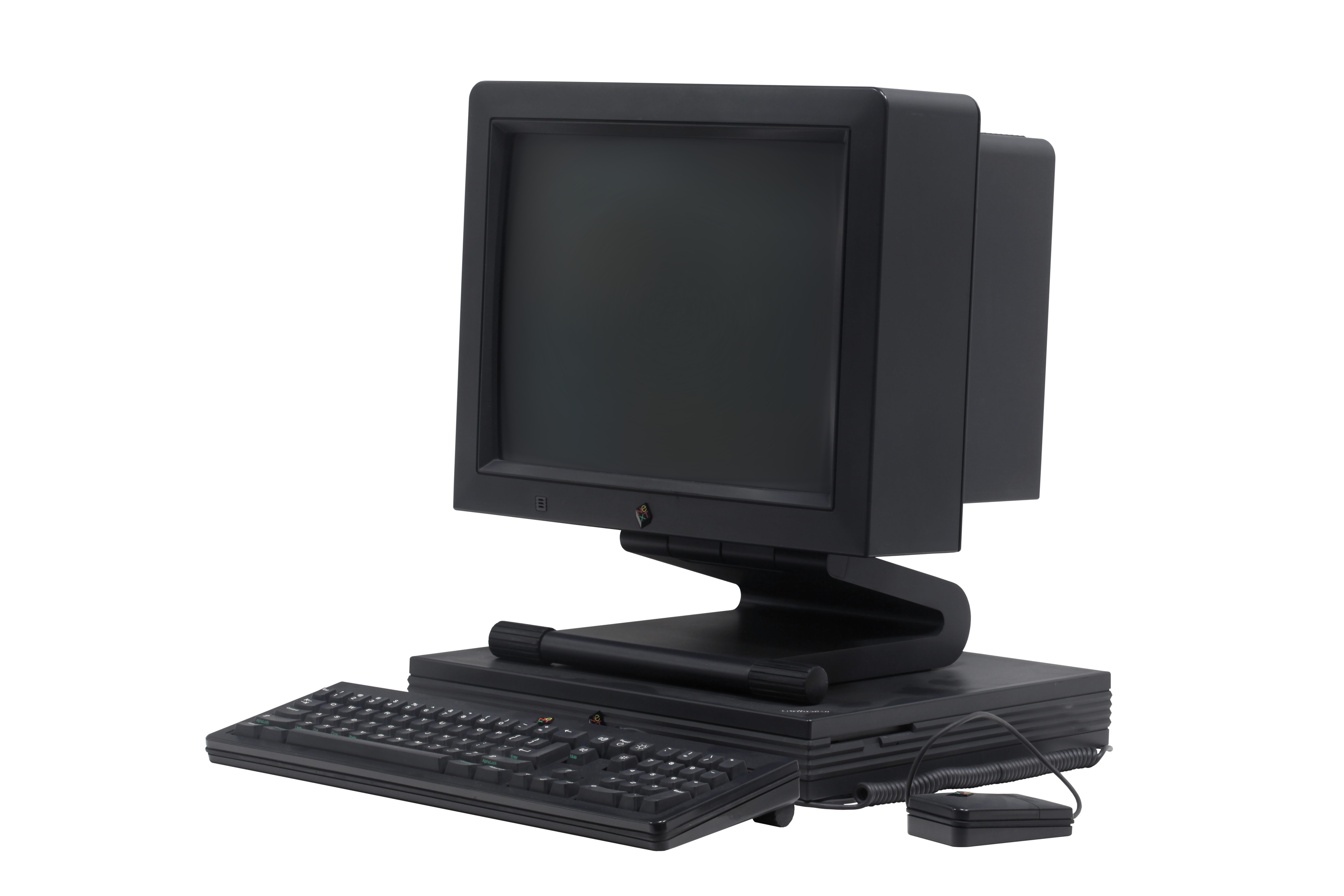
NeXTstation pizzabox form factor

==== Cube ====
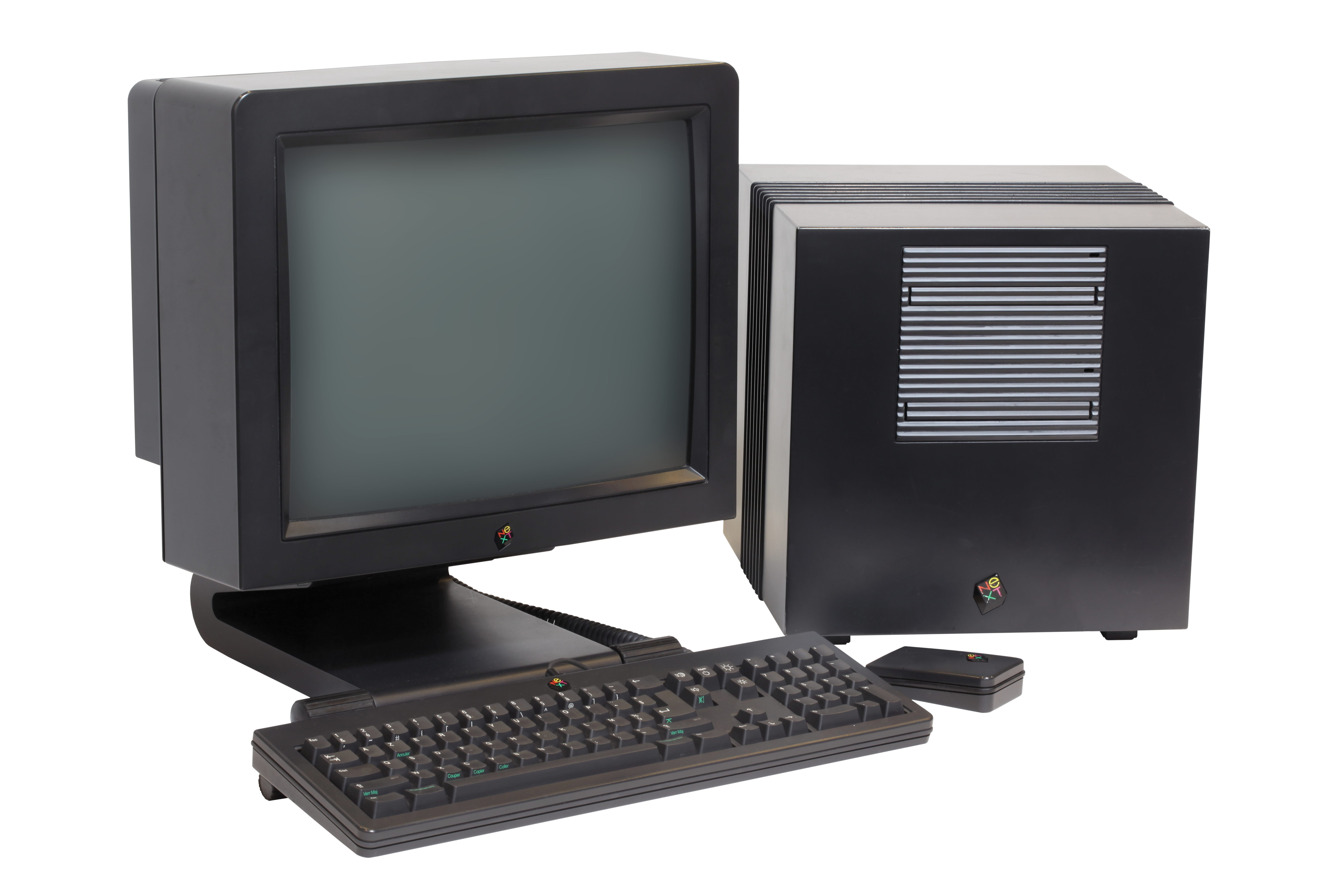
NeXTcube had a cube enclosure.

Cube Workstations have a cube case enclosure to house the motherboard, PCI-E expansion cards, GPU, CPU, DRAM DIMM slots, computer cooling equipment, chipsets, I/O ports, hard disk drives, and solid-state drives.

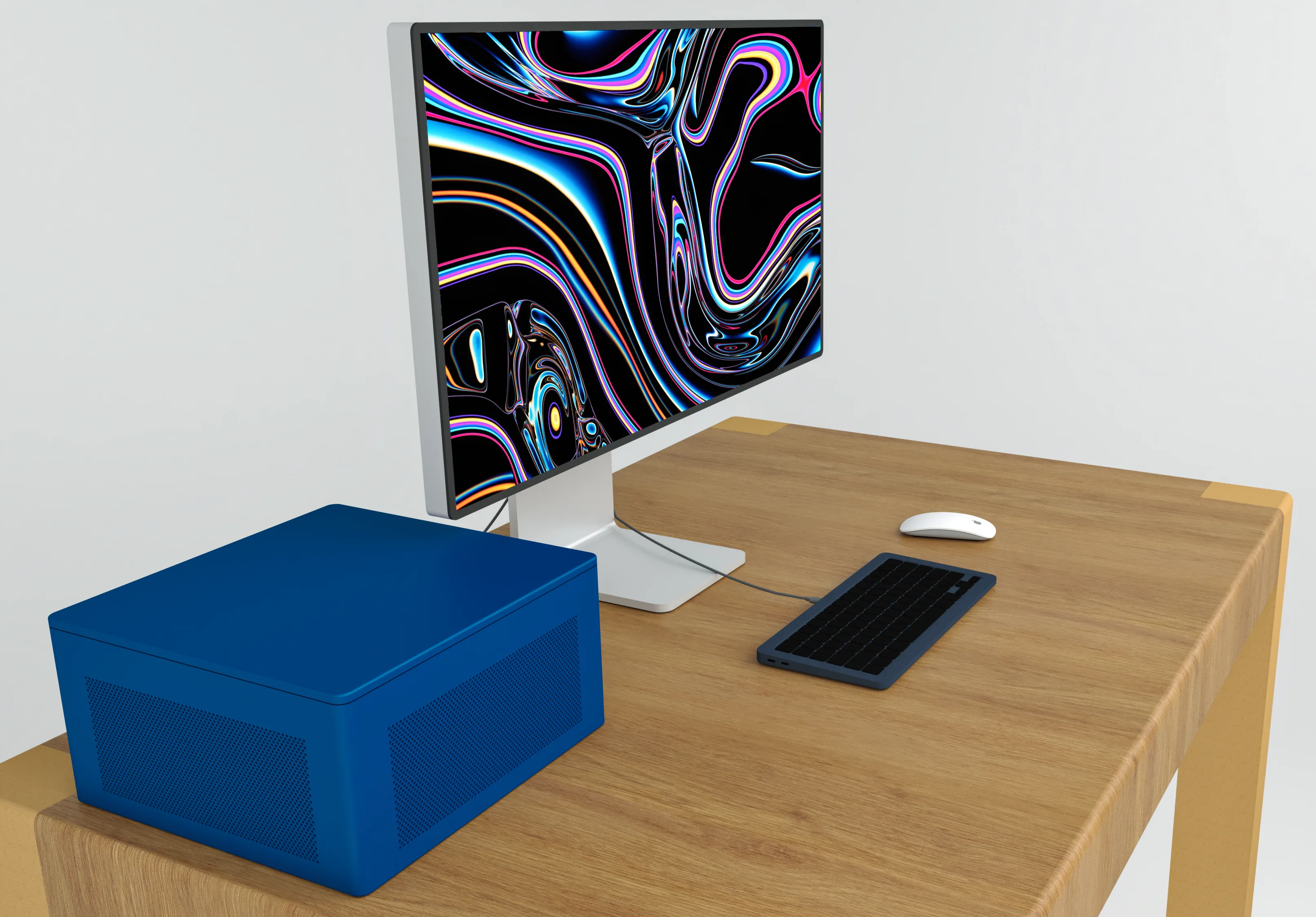
3D sketch of a half cube workstation

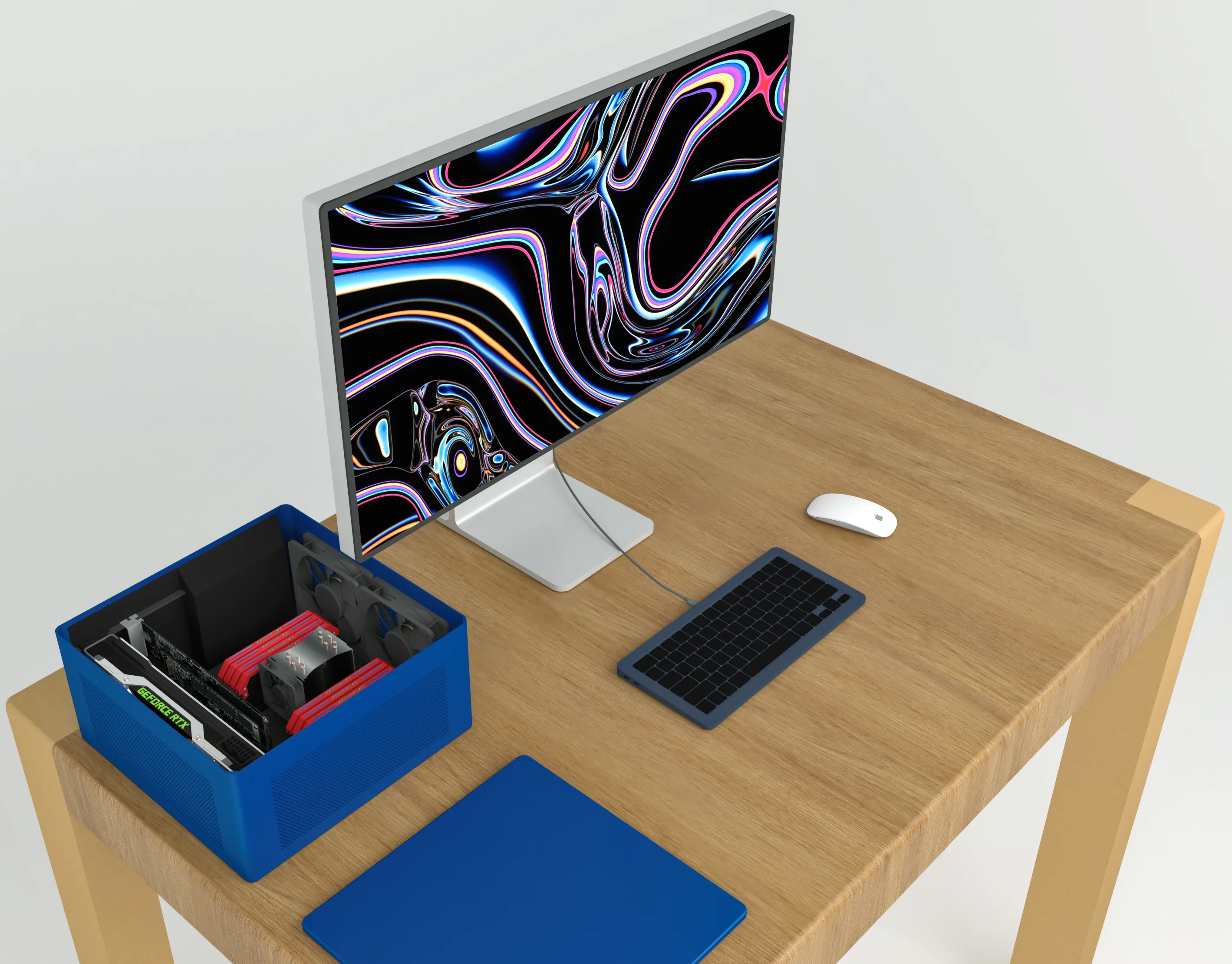
Case enclosure holds a GPU, PCI-E SSD, DRAM DIMM sticks, and air cooling heat sink on the CPU

==== Open Frame ====
Open-frame cases provide easy access to components for servicing and generally have fewer airflow restrictions. They are also commonly designed to accommodate liquid-cooling systems and may have an industrial-style appearance. However, their open construction provides less protection from dust, which can result in more frequent cleaning. The exposed components can also be cleaned relatively easily using compressed air.

=== By usage ===
==== Gaming computer ====
Gaming computers are desktop computers with high performance CPU, GPU, and RAM optimized for playing video games at high resolution and frame rates. Gaming computer peripherals usually include mechanical keyboards for faster response time, and a gaming computer mouse which can track higher dots per inch movement.

==== Home theater ====
These desktops are connected to home entertainment systems and typically used for amusement purposes. They come with high definition display, video graphics, surround sound and TV tuner systems to complement typical PC features.

==== Thin client / Internet appliance ====
Over time some traditional desktop computers have been replaced with thin clients utilizing off-site computing solutions like the cloud. As more services and applications are served over the internet from off-site servers, local computing needs decrease, this drives desktop computers to be smaller, cheaper, and need less powerful hardware. More applications and in some cases entire virtual desktops are moved off-site and the desktop computer runs only an operating system or a shell application while the actual content is served from a server. Thin client computers may do almost all of their computing on a virtual machine in another site. Internal, hosted virtual desktops can offer users a completely consistent experience from anywhere.

==== Workstation ====
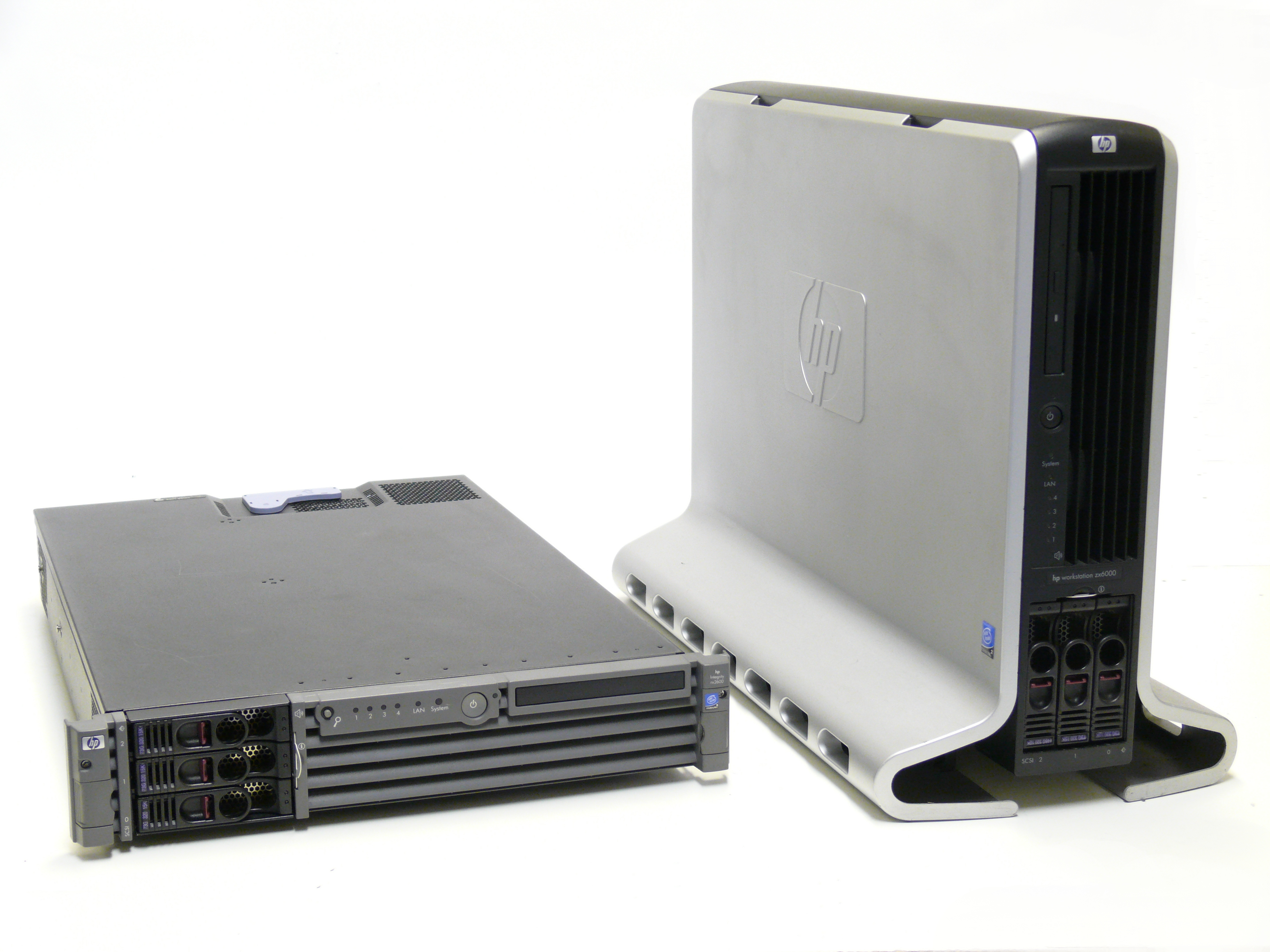
HP Integrity server with rack-mountable and desktop variants

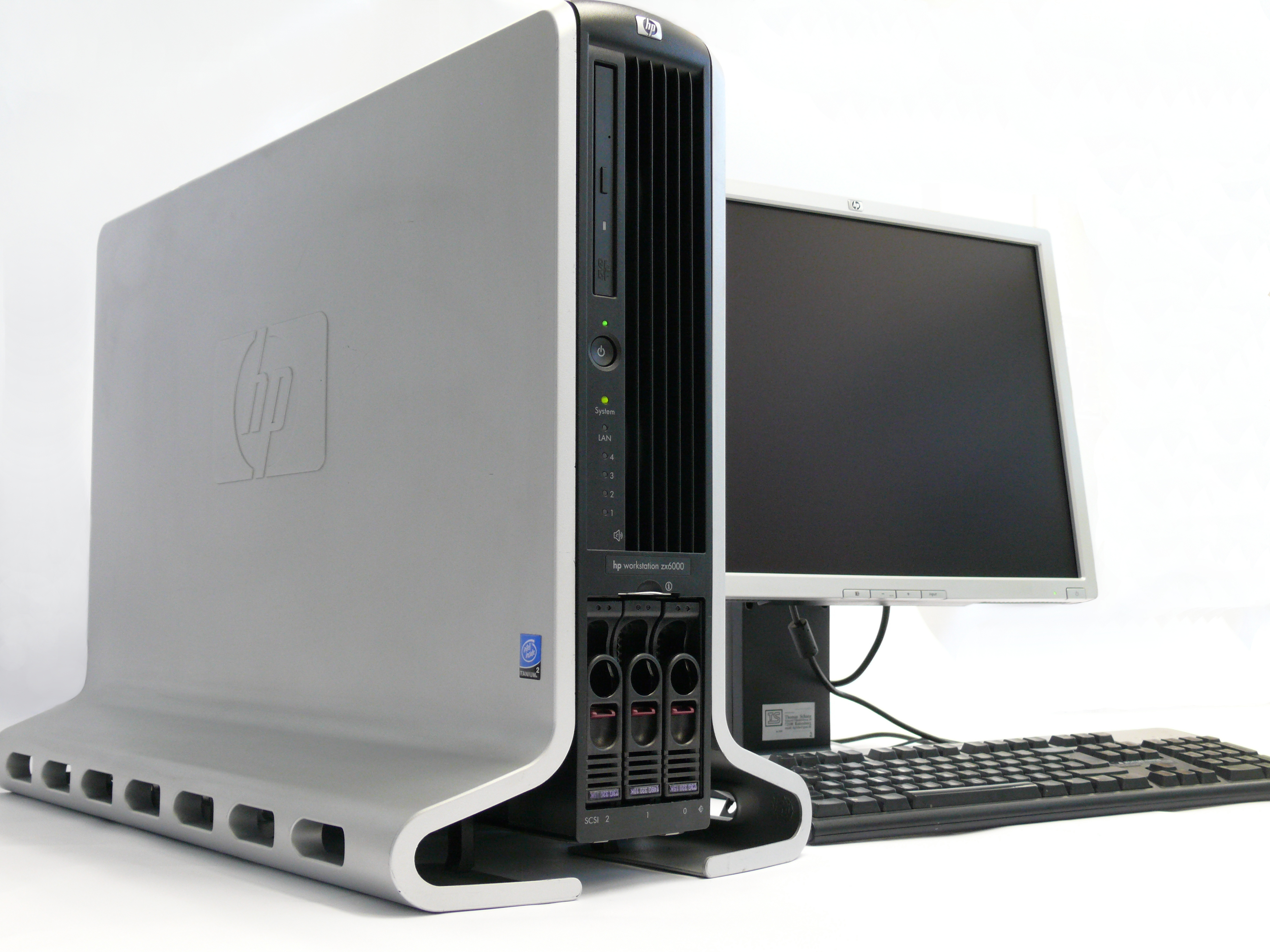
HP9000 workstation, based on an Integrity desktop server

Workstations are advanced class of personal computers designed for a user and more powerful than a regular PC but less powerful than a server in regular computing. They are capable of high-resolution and three-dimensional interfaces, and typically used to perform scientific and engineering work. Like server computers, they are often connected with other workstations. The main form-factor for this class is a Tower case, but most vendors produce compact or all-in-one low-end workstations. Most tower workstations can be converted to a rack-mount version.

==== Desktop server ====
Oriented for small business class of servers; typically entry-level server machines, with similar to workstation/gaming PC computing powers and with some mainstream servers features, but with only basic graphic abilities; and some desktop servers can be converted to workstations.

== Comparison with laptops ==
Desktops have an advantage over laptops in that the spare parts and extensions tend to be standardized, resulting in lower prices and greater availability. For example, the size and mounting of the motherboard are standardized into ATX, microATX, BTX or other form factors. Desktops have several standardized expansion slots, like conventional PCI or PCI Express, while laptops tend to have only one mini-PCI slot and one PC Card slot (or ExpressCard slot). Procedures for assembly and disassembly of desktops tend to be simple and standardized as well. This tends not to be the case for laptops, though adding or replacing some parts, like the optical drive, hard disk, or adding an extra memory module is often quite simple. This means that a desktop computer configuration, usually a tower case, can be customized and upgraded to a greater extent than laptops. This customization has kept tower cases popular among gamers and enthusiasts.

Another advantage of the desktop is that (apart from environmental concerns) power consumption is not as critical as in laptop computers because the desktop is exclusively powered from the wall socket. Desktop computers also provide more space for cooling fans and vents to dissipate heat, allowing enthusiasts to overclock with less risk. The two large microprocessor manufacturers, Intel and AMD, have developed special CPUs for mobile computers (e.g. laptops) that consume less power and lower heat, but with lower performance levels.

Laptop computers, conversely, offer portability that desktop systems (including small form factor and all-in-one desktops) cannot due to their compact size and clamshell design. The laptop's all-in-one design provides a built-in keyboard and a pointing device (such as a touchpad) for its user and can draw on power supplied by a rechargeable battery. Laptops also commonly integrate wireless technologies like Wi-Fi, Bluetooth, and 3G, giving them a broader range of options for connecting to the internet, though this trend is changing as newer desktop computers come integrated with one or more of these technologies.

A desktop computer needs a UPS to handle electrical disturbances like short interruptions, blackouts, and spikes; achieving an on-battery time of more than 20–30 minutes for a desktop PC requires a large and expensive UPS. A laptop with a sufficiently charged battery can continue to be used for hours in case of a power outage and is not affected by short power interruptions and blackouts.

A desktop computer often has the advantage over a comparable laptop in computational capacity. Overclocking is often more feasible on a desktop than on a laptop; similarly, hardware add-ons such as discrete graphics co-processors may be possible to install only in a desktop.

== See also ==
- Desktop environment
- Desktop metaphor
- Gaming computer
- Home computer
- Legacy ports
- Mobile workstation
- Operating system
- Single-board computer
- Software
- x86 and x86-64, the most common architecture in desktop computers, the latter has mostly taken over
