= NeXT Computer =

Workstation computer

- Manufacturer: NeXT, Redwood City, California
- Type: Workstation
- Released: October 12, 1988; 37 years ago
- Introductory price: US$6,500 (equivalent to $17,700 in 2025)
- Discontinued: 1991
- Operating system: NeXTSTEP, OPENSTEP
- CPU: Motorola 68030 @ 25 MHz, 68882 FPU @ 25 MHz, 56001 DSP @ 25 MHz
- Memory: Shipped with 8 MB, expandable to 64 MB using 4 MB SIMMs
- Storage: 256 MB magneto-optical drive, optional 330 MB or 660 MB hard disk
- Display: MegaPixel 17" monitor
- Graphics: 1120×832, four-level grayscale
- Sound: Built-in speaker
- Input: 85-key keyboard, 2-button mouse
- Connectivity: Ethernet
- Power: 300 Watts, 3 Amperes
- Dimensions: 1-foot (305 mm) die-cast magnesium cube-shaped case
- Successor: NeXTcube

NeXT Computer (also called the NeXT Computer System) is a workstation computer that was developed, marketed, and sold by NeXT Inc. It was introduced in October 1988 as the company's first and flagship product, at a price of US$6,500 (equivalent to $17,700 in 2025), aimed at the higher-education market. It was designed around the Motorola 68030 CPU and 68882 floating-point coprocessor, with a clock speed of 25 MHz. Its NeXTSTEP operating system is based on the Mach microkernel and BSD-derived Unix, with a proprietary GUI using a Display PostScript-based back end. According to the Science Museum Group, "The enclosure consists of a 1-foot (304.8 mm) die-cast magnesium cube-shaped black case, which led to the machine being informally referred to as 'The Cube'."

The NeXT Computer was renamed NeXTcube in a later upgrade. The NeXTstation, a more affordable version of the NeXTcube, was released in 1990.

== Launch ==
The NeXT Computer was launched in October 1988 at a lavish invitation-only event, "NeXT Introduction – the Introduction to the NeXT Generation of Computers for Education" at the Louise M. Davies Symphony Hall in San Francisco, California. The next day, selected educators and software developers were invited to attend—for a $100 registration fee—the first public technical overview of the NeXT computer at an event called "The NeXT Day" at the San Francisco Hilton. It gave those interested in developing NeXT software an insight into the system's software architecture and object-oriented programming. Steve Jobs was the luncheon's speaker.

== Reception ==
In 1989, BYTE magazine listed the NeXT Computer among the "Excellence" winners of the BYTE Awards, stating that it showed "what can be done when a personal computer is designed as a system, and not a collection of hardware elements". Citing as "truly innovative" the optical drive, DSP and object-oriented programming environment, it concluded that "the NeXT Computer is worth every penny of its $6,500 market price". The workstation was not a significant commercial success, failing to reach the high-volume sales of the Apple II, Commodore 64, Mac, or IBM PC compatibles. This was mainly blamed on the computer's substantial price, and the fact that there was not a great demand for the system outside of the higher-education market. Next Computers were mainly sold to universities, financial institutions, and government agencies.

The NeXT Computer was the first computer to be equipped with a magneto-optical drive, which held 256 MB and served as the machine's main storage.

== Legacy ==
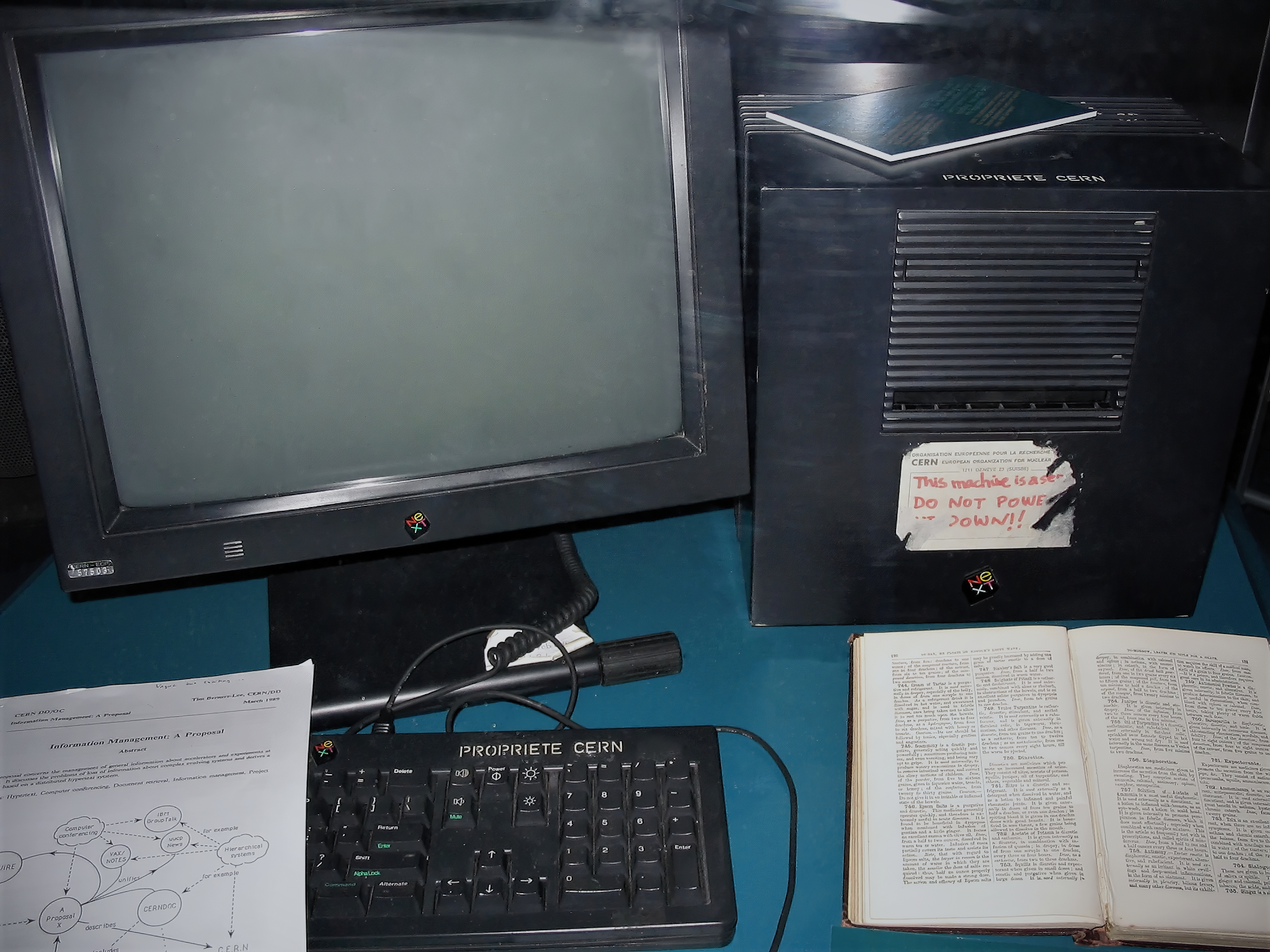
This NeXTcube was used by Tim Berners-Lee as the first server on the World Wide Web.

A NeXT Computer and its object-oriented development tools and libraries were used (programming was done in Objective C using Interface Builder) by Tim Berners-Lee and Robert Cailliau at CERN to create the world's first web browser (WorldWideWeb) and web server (running CERN httpd software).

The NeXT platform was used by Jesse Tayler at Paget Press to develop the first electronic app store, called the Electronic AppWrapper, in the early 1990s. Issue #3 was first demonstrated to Steve Jobs at NeXTWorld Expo 1993.

Pioneering PC games Doom, Doom II, and Quake (with respective level editors) were developed by id Software on NeXT machines. Doom engine games such as Heretic, Hexen, and Strife were also developed on NeXT hardware using id's tools.

NeXT technology provisioned the first online food delivery system called CyberSlice, using GIS based geolocation, on which Steve Jobs performed the first online order of pizza with tomato and basil. CyberSlice was curated into the Inventions of the 20th Century, Computer Science at the Smithsonian Institution in Washington, D.C.

== Architecture ==
The NeXT Computer features three Motorola-manufactured chips: the Motorola 68030 CPU, a Motorola 68882 Floating Point Unit, and a Motorola 56001 digital signal processor.

== See also ==
- Previous, emulator of NeXT hardware
- NeXTstation
- NeXTcube
- NeXTcube Turbo
- NeXT character set
- Power Mac G4 Cube
