= NeXT Laser Printer =

The NeXT Laser Printer [NeXT PN N2000] was a 400 DPI PostScript laser printer, sold by NeXT from late 1988 to 1993 for the NeXTstation and NeXTcube workstations and manufactured by Canon Inc. It included an adjustable paper tray, which enabled it to print on several paper sizes including A4, letter-size, and those of legal and envelope varieties. It was very similar to other printers based on the Canon SX engine, such as the Apple LaserWriter II series and HP LaserJet II/III, although those other printers only printed at 300x300 dpi. Some parts (such as the toner cartridge and input paper tray) are interchangeable with the LaserJet II/III.

The printer used a proprietary high-speed serial interface, and was in essence a predecessor of the software-rendering approach, as it used the DisplayPostscript renderer in NeXTStep rather than a hardware PostScript renderer. Regardless of the lack of dedicated rendering hardware, it usually achieved close to its rated speed of 8 ppm, as the NeXTStation had a much faster CPU (25 or 33MHz 68040) and greater memory capacity (up to 128 MB in Turbo models) than the rendering engines of contemporary printers. Because NeXTStep used DisplayPostscript extensively in its windowing system, the PostScript rendering path was optimized; thus, printed documents had a true output WYSIWYG corresponding to the screen.

NeXT also produced a color inkjet printer, the SCSI-I-connected, Tabloid-capable, 360 DPI Color Bubblejet model [NeXT PN N2004 (US) N2005 (UK)], based on the technology of the Canon BubbleJet.
