= NeXTstation =

High-end workstation computer by NeXT

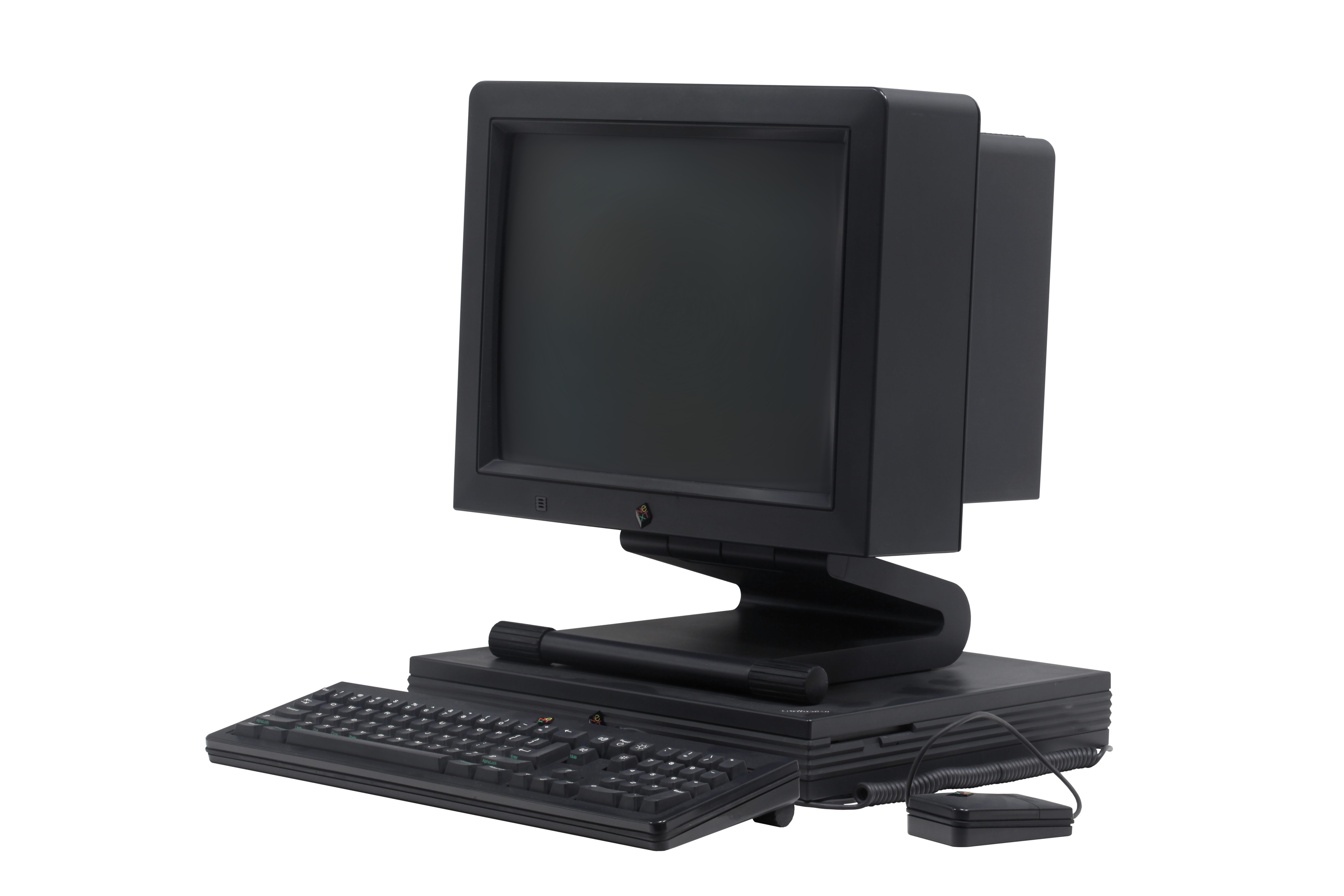
- NeXTstation computer, monitor, keyboard, and mouse
- Developer: NeXT
- Manufacturer: NeXT
- Type: Workstation computer
- Released: September 18, 1990; 35 years ago
- Introductory price: US$4,995 (equivalent to $12,300 in 2025) NeXTstation; US$7,995 (equivalent to $19,700 in 2025) NeXTstation Color; US$6,500 (equivalent to $16,000 in 2025) NeXTstation Turbo
- Discontinued: 1993
- Operating system: NeXTSTEP, OPENSTEP, NetBSD (limited support)
- CPU: Motorola 68040
- Memory: 8 MB - 32 MB; 8 MB - 128 MB (Turbo)
- Display: MegaPixel or MegaPixel Color, 1120 × 832 pixels
- Graphics: 4-level greyscale or 4,096 colors

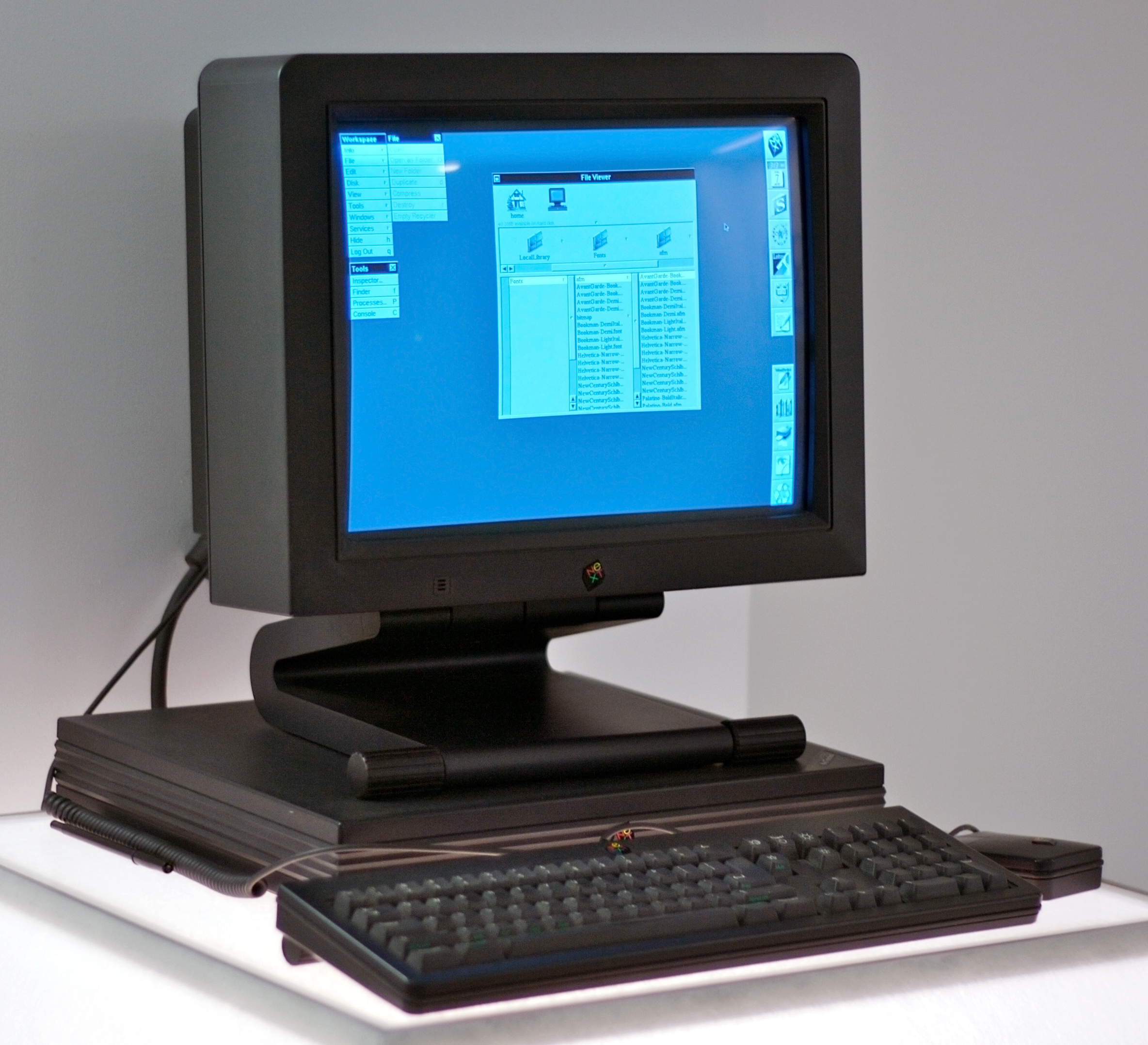
A NeXTstation displaying its native desktop environment

NeXTstation is a high-end workstation computer developed, manufactured, and sold by NeXT from 1990 until 1993. It runs the NeXTSTEP operating system. The system was designed to be a lower-cost option compared to the company's upscale product, the NeXTcube. Compared to the cube, it removed a number of features and had limited expandability, allowing it to fit in a much smaller pizza-box form factor case.

There were two major series of the system released during its production run. The initial models were the NeXTstation and NeXTstation Color. Both were based on the Motorola 68040 processor running at 25 MHz. The Color units supported 12-bit color graphics (4,096 colors) stored in a separate 1.5 MB VRAM memory. Turbo versions were released in April 1992, which increased the speed of the processor to 33 MHz and increased the maximum amount of main memory from 32 to 128 MB of RAM.

Both the station and the cube initially used the same displays, the original MegaPixel display used on the original NeXT Computer. These used a single custom connector that included wiring for the monitor's built-in speaker and the Apple Desktop Bus connector for the keyboard. The mouse plugged into the keyboard. The MegaPixel Color Display moved to the (then) standard DB13W3 monitor connector, and the sound, keyboard and mouse connections were moved to the external NeXT Sound Box.

Although the initial models were announced in September 1990, a lack of availability of the 68040 processor resulted in volume shipments being delayed until December of that year, also affecting the NeXTcube.

== Overview ==
The NeXTstation was released as a more affordable alternative to the NeXTcube at about US$4,995 or about half the price. Several models were produced, including the NeXTstation (25 MHz), NeXTstation Turbo (33 MHz), NeXTstation Color (25 MHz) and NeXTstation Turbo Color (33 MHz). In total, NeXT sold about 50,000 computers (not including sales to government organizations), making the NeXTstation a rarity today.

The NeXTstation originally shipped with a NeXT MegaPixel Display 17" monitor (with built-in speakers), keyboard, and mouse. It is nicknamed "the slab", since the pizza box form factor contrasts quite sharply with the original NeXT Computer's basic shape (otherwise known as "the cube").

The Pyro accelerator board increases the speed of a NeXTstation by replacing the standard 25 MHz processor with a 50 MHz one. There was also a very rare accelerator board known as the Nitro; between 5 and 20 are estimated to have been made. It increased the speed of a NeXTstation Turbo by replacing the standard 33 MHz processor with a 40 MHz one.

John Carmack developed the PC Game Doom on a NeXTStation Color.

After NeXT ceased manufacturing hardware in 1993, Canon Computer Systems (a subsidiary of Canon Inc.) acquired the rights to the design of and patents pertaining to the NeXTstation. They later released the Object.Station, an x86-based workstation using the NeXTstation design, in 1994. Canon had been a large stakeholder in NeXT since 1989.

== Specifications ==
- CPU: Motorola 68040, 25 MHz or 33 MHz (Turbo)
- Memory: 8 MB (12 MB for NeXTstation Color, 16 MB for NeXTstation Turbo Color)
  - NeXTstation: Eight 30-pin SIMM slots (up to 32 MB)
  - NeXTstation Color: Eight 72-pin SIMM slots (up to 32 MB)
  - NeXTstation Turbo/Turbo Color: Four 72-pin SIMM slots (up to 128 MB)
- Display resolution: 1120 × 832 px
- Color depth:
  - NeXTstation/Turbo (256 KB VRAM): 4 colors (black, white and two shades of gray)
  - NeXTstation Color/Turbo Color (1.5 MB VRAM): 4,096 colors (12-bit)
- Digital signal processor: Motorola 56001 @ 25 MHz (16-bit, 44.1 kHz, stereo, 24 KB RAM, upgradable to 576 KB)
- Speaker built into the monitor
- Input/Output:
  - Floppy internal connector
  - SCSI internal connector
  - SCSI-2 external connector (MD50)
  - DSP port (DA-15)
  - NeXTstation/Turbo: MegaPixel Display port (DB-19)
  - NeXTstation Color/Turbo Color: Display port (13W3)
  - Proprietary NeXT Laser Printer port (DE-9)
  - Two RS-423 serial ports (Mini-DIN 8)
  - 10BASE-T and 10BASE-2 Ethernet
- Media: 3.5 in 2.88 MB floppy disk drive
- Storage: hard disk from 105 MB, 250 MB, 340 MB, 400 MB to 4 GB (Larger sizes may work but the OS cannot use partitions larger than 4 GB)
- Operating System: NeXTSTEP, OPENSTEP. NetBSD supports some of the NeXTstation's hardware.
- Peripherals:
  - Modem
  - Keyboard: Full-stroke mechanical (85 keys)
  - Mouse: 2 button opto-mechanical
- Size/Weight: 39.8 (W) × 36.5 (D) × 6.4 (H) cm / 6 kg (13 lb)

== See also ==
- Previous, emulator of NeXT hardware
- NeXT Computer
- NeXTcube Turbo
- NeXT character set
