= NeXTSTEP =

Operating system from NeXT Computer

NeXTSTEP OPENSTEP for Mach

- NeXTSTEP graphical user interface
- Developer: NeXT
- Written in: C, Objective-C
- OS family: Unix-like
- Working state: Discontinued
- Source model: Closed source with some open-source components
- Initial release: September 18, 1989; 37 years ago
- Final release: 3.3 / 1995
- Final preview: 4.2 Pre-release 2 / September 1997
- Marketing target: Enterprise, academia
- Package manager: Installer.app
- Supported platforms: Motorola 68030/68040, IA-32, SPARC, PA-RISC
- Kernel type: Hybrid (Mach, BSD)
- Userland: BSD
- Default user interface: Graphical
- License: Proprietary EULA
- Succeeded by: Darwin; Rhapsody

NeXTSTEP is a discontinued object-oriented, multitasking operating system developed by NeXT, the technology company founded by Steve Jobs. Based on the Mach kernel and the UNIX-derived BSD, it was introduced in 1989 for the company's computers before being ported to several other computer architectures. Following NeXT's transition away from hardware, version 4 was released as OPENSTEP for Mach, named after the company's OpenStep application programming interface (API).

Although relatively unsuccessful at the time, NeXTSTEP is notable for its influence on software development and computing history. Tim Berners-Lee developed the first web browser and web server on a NeXTSTEP workstation, while id Software used the operating system during development of Doom and Quake.

In 1996, Apple Computer acquired NeXT and used OPENSTEP for Mach as the foundation for Mac OS X (later macOS). Its technologies continue to form the basis of Darwin, the core operating system underlying macOS, iOS, iPadOS, watchOS, and tvOS.

== Overview ==
NeXTSTEP (also stylized as NeXTstep, NeXTStep, and NEXTSTEP) is a combination of several parts:

- a Unix operating system based on the Mach kernel, plus BSD
- Display PostScript and a proprietary windowing engine
- the Objective-C language and runtime
- an object-oriented (OO) application layer, including several "kits"
- development tools for the OO layers.

NeXTSTEP is an implementation of the latter three components. Its toolkits serve as the primary development system for software on the platform.

It introduced the idea of the Dock (carried through OpenStep and into macOS) and the Shelf. NeXTSTEP originated or innovated many other GUI concepts which became common in other operating systems: 3D chiseled widgets, large full-color icons, system-wide drag and drop of a wide range of objects beyond file icons, system-wide piped services, real-time scrolling and window dragging, properties dialog boxes called "inspectors", and window modification notices (such as the saved status of a file). The system is among the first general-purpose user interfaces to handle publishing color standards, transparency, sophisticated sound and music processing (through a Motorola 56000 DSP), advanced graphics primitives, internationalization, and modern typography, consistently across all applications.

Additional kits were added to the product line. These include Portable Distributed Objects (PDO), which allow easy remote invocation, and Enterprise Objects Framework, an object-relational database system. The kits made the system particularly interesting to custom application programmers, and NeXTSTEP had a long history in the financial programming domain.

== History ==
NeXTSTEP was built on the Mach kernel and the Unix-derived BSD, initially 4.3BSD-Tahoe. A preview release (version 0.8) was shipped with the NeXT Computer on October 12, 1988, and the first commercial release, NeXTSTEP 1.0, was made available on September 18, 1989. Later releases incorporated newer BSD code, including 4.3BSD-Reno in NeXTSTEP 3.0.

NeXTSTEP was initially released for NeXT's Motorola 68000-based workstations. As the company transitioned away from hardware, NeXTSTEP 3.3, released in early 1995, was ported to x86, SPARC, and PA-RISC.

As part of this transition, NeXT partnered with Sun Microsystems to develop the OpenStep specification, separating the application frameworks from the underlying operating system so they could be implemented on multiple platforms.

With the introduction of the OpenStep specification, NeXT rebranded NeXTSTEP as OPENSTEP for Mach, its implementation of the specification that retained the existing Mach-based operating system and compatibility with NeXTSTEP applications. Versions 4.0, 4.1, and 4.2 were released between 1996 and 1997.

Following Apple's acquisition of NeXT in 1996, OPENSTEP for Mach became the basis for Rhapsody, which evolved into Mac OS X (later macOS). Its technologies continue to underpin Darwin, the foundation of macOS, iOS, iPadOS, watchOS, and tvOS.

== Legacy ==
The first web browser, WorldWideWeb, and the first app store were all invented on the NeXTSTEP platform.

1990 CERN: A Joint proposal for a hypertext system is presented to the management. Mike Sendall buys a NeXT cube for evaluation, and gives it to Tim Berners-Lee. Tim's prototype implementation on NeXTSTEP is made in the space of a few months, thanks to the qualities of the NeXTSTEP software development system. This prototype offers WYSIWYG browsing/authoring! Current Web browsers used in "surfing the Internet" are mere passive windows, depriving the user of the possibility to contribute. During some sessions in the CERN cafeteria, Tim and I try to find a catching name for the system. I was determined that the name should not yet again be taken from Greek mythology. Tim proposes "World-Wide Web". I like this very much, except that it is difficult to pronounce in French...

— Robert Cailliau, 2 November 1995

Some features and keyboard shortcuts now common to web browsers originated in NeXTSTEP conventions. The basic layout options of HTML 1.0 and 2.0 are attributable to those features of NeXT's Text class.

Lighthouse Design Ltd. developed Diagram!, a drawing tool, originally called BLT (for Box-and-Line Tool) in which objects (boxes) are connected together using "smart links" (lines) to construct diagrams such a flow charts. This basic design can be enhanced by the simple addition of new links and new documents, located anywhere in the local area network, that foreshadowed Tim Berners-Lee's initial prototype that was written on NeXTSTEP in October–December 1990.

In the 1990s, the pioneering PC games Doom, Doom II, Quake, and their respective level editors were developed by id Software on NeXT machines. Other games based on the Doom engine such as Heretic and its sequel Hexen by Raven Software, and Strife by Rogue Entertainment were developed on NeXT hardware using id's tools.

Although relatively unsuccessful at the time, it attracted interest from computer scientists and researchers. It hosted the original development of the Electronic AppWrapper, invented by Jesse Tayler in the early 1990s, which was the first commercial software distribution catalog to collectively manage encryption and provide digital rights for application software and digital media (a forerunner of the modern "app store" concept).

Altsys made the NeXTSTEP application Virtuoso. Version 2 was later ported to the classic Mac OS and Windows, becoming Macromedia FreeHand version 4. The modern "Notebook" interface for Mathematica, and the advanced spreadsheet Lotus Improv, were developed using NeXTSTEP. The software that controlled MCI's Friends and Family calling plan program was developed using NeXTSTEP.

About the time of the release of NeXTSTEP 3.2, NeXT partnered with Sun Microsystems to develop OpenStep. It is the product of an effort to separate the underlying operating system from the higher-level object libraries to create a cross-platform object-oriented API standard derived from NeXTSTEP. OpenStep was released for Sun's Solaris, Windows NT, and NeXT's Mach kernel-based operating system. NeXT's implementation is called "OPENSTEP for Mach" and its first release (4.0) superseded NeXTSTEP 3.3 on NeXT, Sun, and Intel IA-32 systems.

Following an announcement on December 20, 1996, Apple Computer acquired NeXT on February 4, 1997, for $429 million. Based upon the "OPENSTEP for Mach" operating system, and developing the OpenStep API to become Cocoa, Apple created the basis of Mac OS X, and eventually of iOS, iPadOS, watchOS, and tvOS.

GNUstep is a free software implementation of the OpenStep standard.

== Release history ==
Version	Date	Distribution medium	Architecture	Basis	Notes
0.8	October 12, 1988	MO disc	m68k	4.3BSD-Tahoe	First public preview, released with the NeXT Computer.
0.8a	1988	MO disc	m68k	4.3BSD-Tahoe	Bugfix release.
0.9	May 1, 1989	MO disc	m68k	4.3BSD-Tahoe	Introduced the Preferences application, interface improvements, and bundled FrameMaker, Mathematica, and additional software.
1.0	September 11, 1989	MO disc	m68k	4.3BSD-Tahoe	Added application termination from Workspace Manager, updated Preferences application, and interface refinements.
1.0a	December 21, 1989	MO disc	m68k	4.3BSD-Tahoe	Bugfix release.
2.0	September 18, 1990	MO disc, CD-ROM	m68k	4.3BSD-Tahoe	Added support for the NeXTstation, NeXTcube and associated new hardware (floppy disk, CD-ROM, Fax modem, and color graphics), along with a redesigned Workspace Manager and dynamic driver loading.
2.1	March 25, 1991	MO disc, CD-ROM	m68k	4.3BSD-Tahoe	Added support for NeXTdimension, TeX, improved internationalization, and bundled Lotus Improv with new systems.
2.1a		MO disc, CD-ROM	m68k	4.3BSD-Tahoe	Bugfix release.
2.2	March 25, 1992	CD-ROM	m68k	4.3BSD-Tahoe	Added support for the NeXTstation Turbo.
3.0	September 8, 1992	CD-ROM	m68k	4.3BSD-Reno	Introduced Distributed Objects, Project Builder and additional development kits; improved networking and file system compatibility.
3.1	May 25, 1993	CD-ROM	m68k, i386	4.3BSD-Reno	Added support for i386 architecture, introduced Multiple Architecture Binaries.
3.2	October 18, 1993	CD-ROM	m68k, i386	4.3BSD-Reno	Improved i386 support with SoftPC for emulating MS-DOS and Windows applications.
3.3	December 7, 1994 (m68k, i386)	CD-ROM	m68k, i386	4.3BSD-Reno	Final release under the NeXTSTEP name. Added support for PA‑RISC and SPARC architectures.
3.3	April 4, 1995 (SPARC, PA‑RISC)	CD-ROM	PA‑RISC, SPARC	4.3BSD-Reno	Final release under the NeXTSTEP name. Added support for PA‑RISC and SPARC architectures.
4.0 PR1	September 7, 1995	CD-ROM	m68k, i386, PA‑RISC, SPARC	4.3BSD-Reno	Preview of NeXTSTEP 4.0 featuring a redesigned user interface, introducing concepts later incorporated into the macOS Dock. Development discontinued in favor of OPENSTEP 4.0, which reverted to the NeXTSTEP 3.3 interface.
4.0	June 25, 1996	CD-ROM	m68k, i386, SPARC	4.3BSD-Reno	First release under the OPENSTEP name. Implements the OpenStep specification. Dropped support for the PA-RISC architecture.
4.1	October 23, 1996	CD-ROM	m68k, i386, SPARC	4.3BSD-Reno	Bugfix release.
4.2	January 24, 1997	CD-ROM	m68k, i386, SPARC	4.3BSD-Reno	Final OPENSTEP release, primarily consisting of bug fixes.
Rhapsody	October 13, 1997	CD-ROM	i386, PPC	4.4BSD	Released following Apple's acquisition of NeXT, serving as the transitional operating system between OPENSTEP and Mac OS X.

Versions up to 4.1 are general releases. OPENSTEP 4.2 pre-release 2 is a bug-fix release published by Apple and supported for five years after its September 1997 release.

== See also ==
- Bundle (macOS), from NeXTSTEP to macOS
- Miller columns, the method of directory browsing that NeXTSTEP's File Viewer uses
- NeXT character set
