= NeXT MegaPixel Display =

Range of CRT-based computer monitors

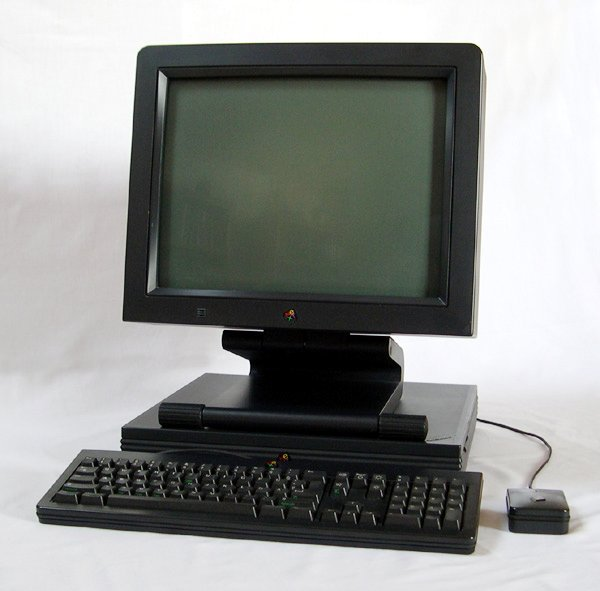
The NeXT MegaPixel Display, sitting on top of a NeXTstation with the original keyboard & mouse

The NeXT MegaPixel Display is a range of CRT-based computer monitors manufactured and sold by NeXT for the NeXTcube and NeXTstation workstations, designed by Hartmut Esslinger/Frog Design Inc.

== Description ==
The original MegaPixel Display released in 1990 was a monochrome 17" monitor displaying four brightness levels (black, dark gray, light gray, and white) in a fixed resolution of 1120 × 832 at 92 DPI (slightly less than a true megapixel at 931,840 total pixels) at 68 Hz.

It integrated a mono microphone, mono speaker, stereo RCA sockets, a 3.5 mm headphone socket and a socket for the keyboard (which in turn provided a socket for the mouse). A unique feature was that the monitor was connected to the computer by a single 6 foot cable which provided power, video signals and the aforementioned signals.

A severe problem with this setup was that the monitor could not be switched off completely while the computer was powered on. The screen could be switched black but the cathode heater always remained on. This led to extreme screen dimming after some years of use, especially when the computer was not turned off overnight as in a server setup or in a busy software lab.

This problem was later rectified with the now ultra rare 4000A model rated at 10,000 hours (~14 months).

The display has a stand that allows it to be tilted. The stand also features two rollers that can be used to move the monitor back and forth despite its heavy weight. The stand also provides a place for the keyboard when not in use, freeing up the (real) desktop in front.

When the NeXTstation Color and the NeXTdimension board were released, NeXT sold rebranded color monitors (e.g. Sony Trinitron) with 13W3 connectors as MegaPixel Color Display in either 17" or 21". Remaining connections (formerly built into the MegaPixel Display) were provided via a DB-19 Y-cable to a separate box, the NeXT Sound Box.

The cost for the 17" MegaPixel Color Display was US$2,995 (equivalent to $7,080 in 2025), with the MegaPixel Display costing US$995 (equivalent to $2,350 in 2025).

== Specifications ==
From the NeXT User's Reference:

=== Monitor ===
- 17-inch monochrome
- Flat screen
- 1120 × 832 × 2 resolution (92 dpi)
- Four colors (black and white and two levels of gray)
- Refresh rate of 68 Hz noninterlaced
- Integrated tilt and roll

=== Interfaces ===
- Keyboard jack
- 8-bit, 8012.8 Hz analog to digital input via microphone miniphone jack (mono)
- 16-bit, 44.1 kHz stereo digital-to-analog converter
- output via:
  - Headphone miniphone jack (stereo)
  - Gold plated RCA line-out jacks (stereo)
  - Integrated speaker (mono)

=== Keyboard and mouse ===
- 85 keys including:
  - cursor keys, numeric pad
  - Monitor brightness, sound volume
  - Power on/off
- Two button opto mechanical Mouse

=== Dimensions ===
- 16 in (w) × 17.3 (h) × 14 (d)
- 408 mm (w) × 440 (h) × 354 (d)
- 50 lb (23 kg)
