= NeXTcube =

Workstation computer by NeXT

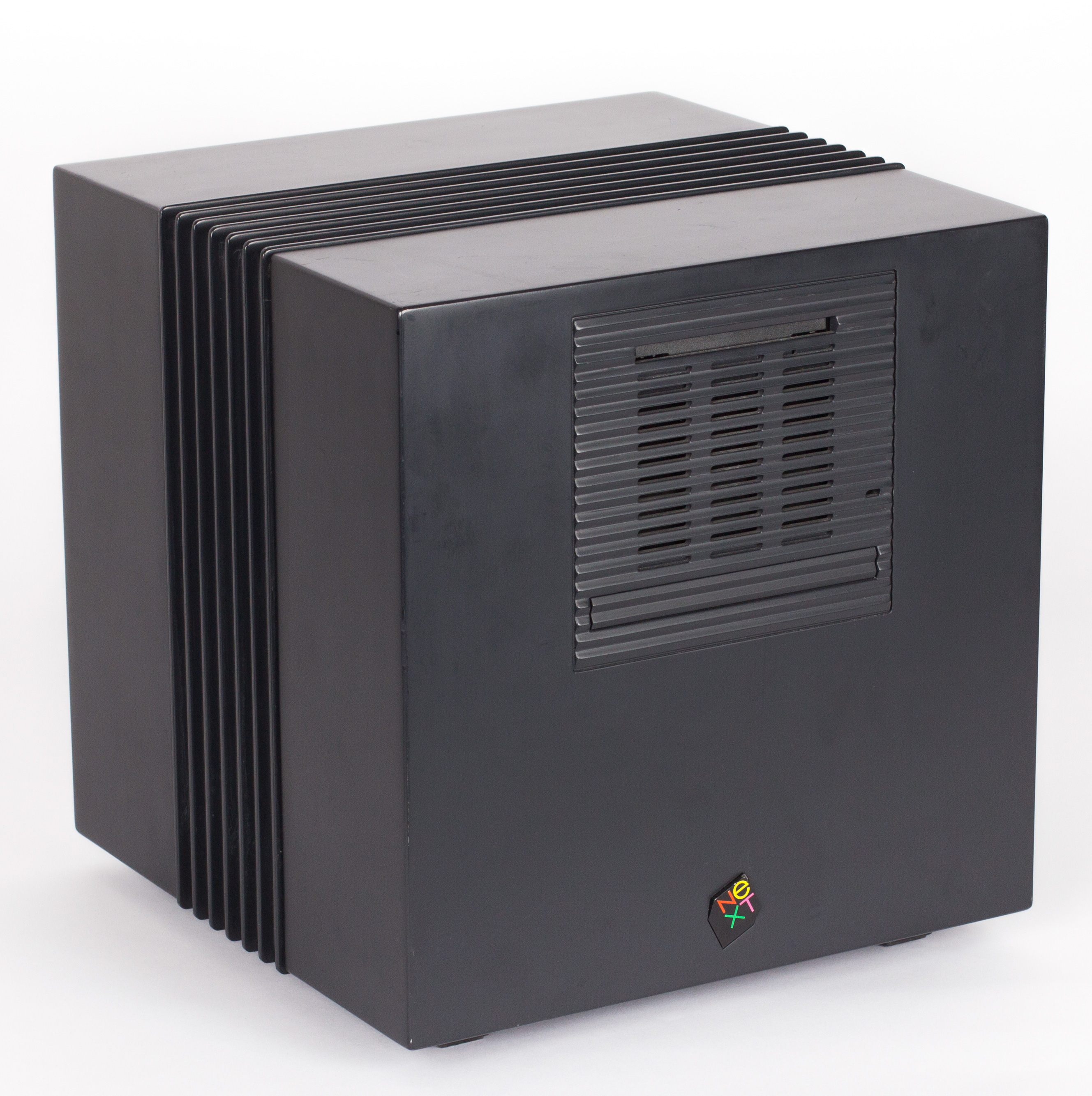
- The base NeXTcube model
- Developer: NeXT
- Manufacturer: NeXT in Fremont, California
- Type: Workstation
- Released: September 18, 1990; 36 years ago
- Introductory price: US$9,995 (equivalent to about $25,000 in 2025)
- Discontinued: 1993
- Operating system: NeXTSTEP, OPENSTEP, NetBSD (limited support)
- CPU: Motorola 68040 @ 25 MHz, 56001 digital signal processor (DSP)
- Memory: 8–64 MB
- Storage: 400 MB, 1.4 GB, or 2.8 GB hard drive 2.88 MB floppy drive
- Display: 1120×832 2-bpp grayscale
- Connectivity: Ethernet
- Dimensions: 1-foot (305 mm) die-cast magnesium cube-shaped case
- Successor: NeXTcube Turbo

The NeXTcube (model N1000A) is a high-end workstation computer developed, manufactured, and sold by NeXT from 1990 to 1993. It preceded the NeXT Computer thin pizza box workstation and is housed in a cube-shaped magnesium enclosure, designed by frog design. The workstation runs the NeXTSTEP operating system and was launched with a $9,995 (equivalent to about $25,000 in 2025) list price.

== Hardware ==
The NeXTcube is the successor to the original NeXT Computer, with a 25 MHz 68040 processor, a hard disk in place of the magneto-optical drive, and a floppy disk drive. NeXT offered a 68040 system board upgrade (and NeXTSTEP 2.0) for US$1,495 (equivalent to $3,680 in 2025). A 33 MHz NeXTcube Turbo was later produced.

NeXT released the NeXTdimension for the NeXTcube, a circuit board based on an Intel i860 processor, which offers 32-bit PostScript color display and video-sampling features.

The Pyro accelerator board replaces the processor with a 50 MHz one.

== Specifications ==
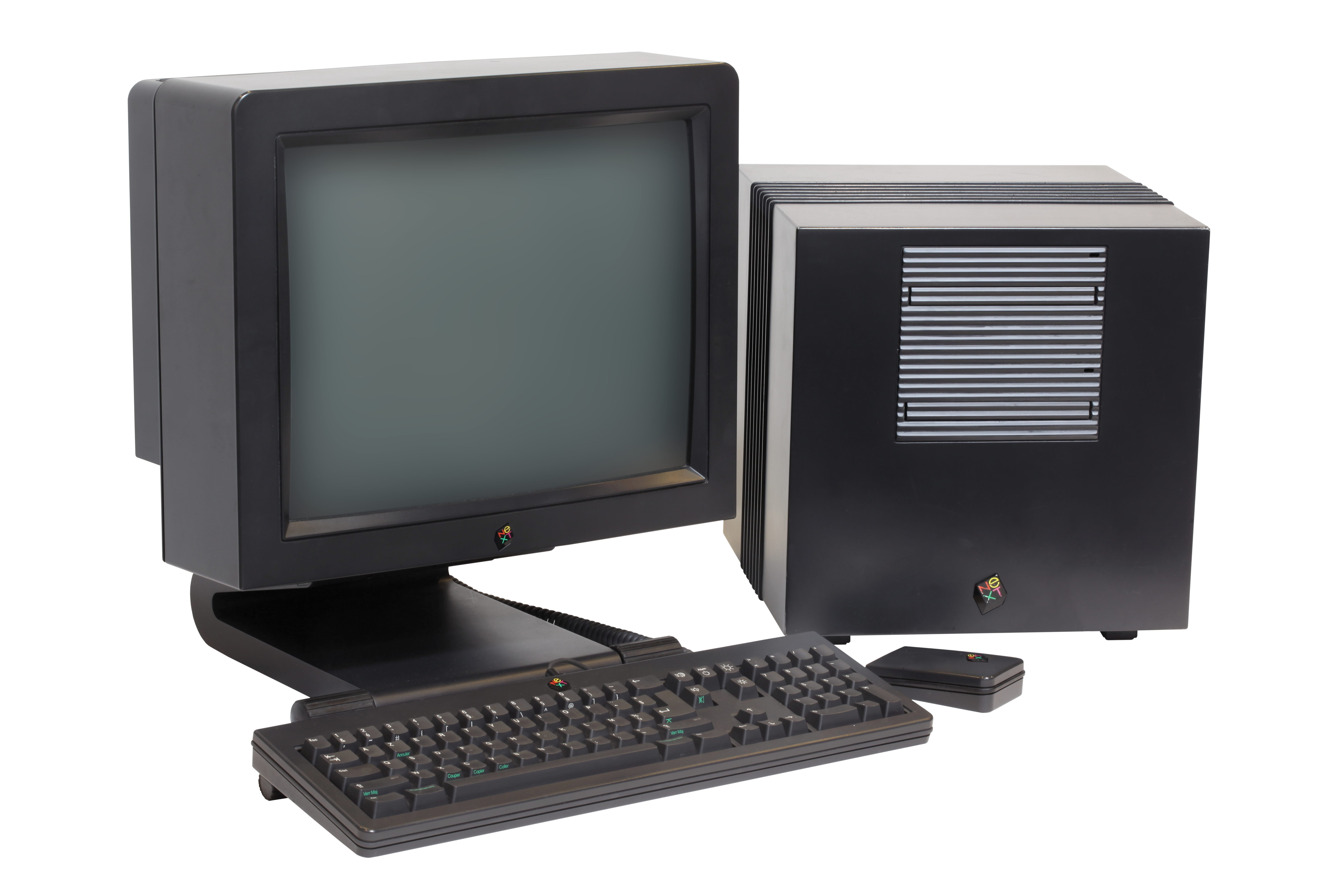
This NeXTcube has the original screen, keyboard, and mouse.

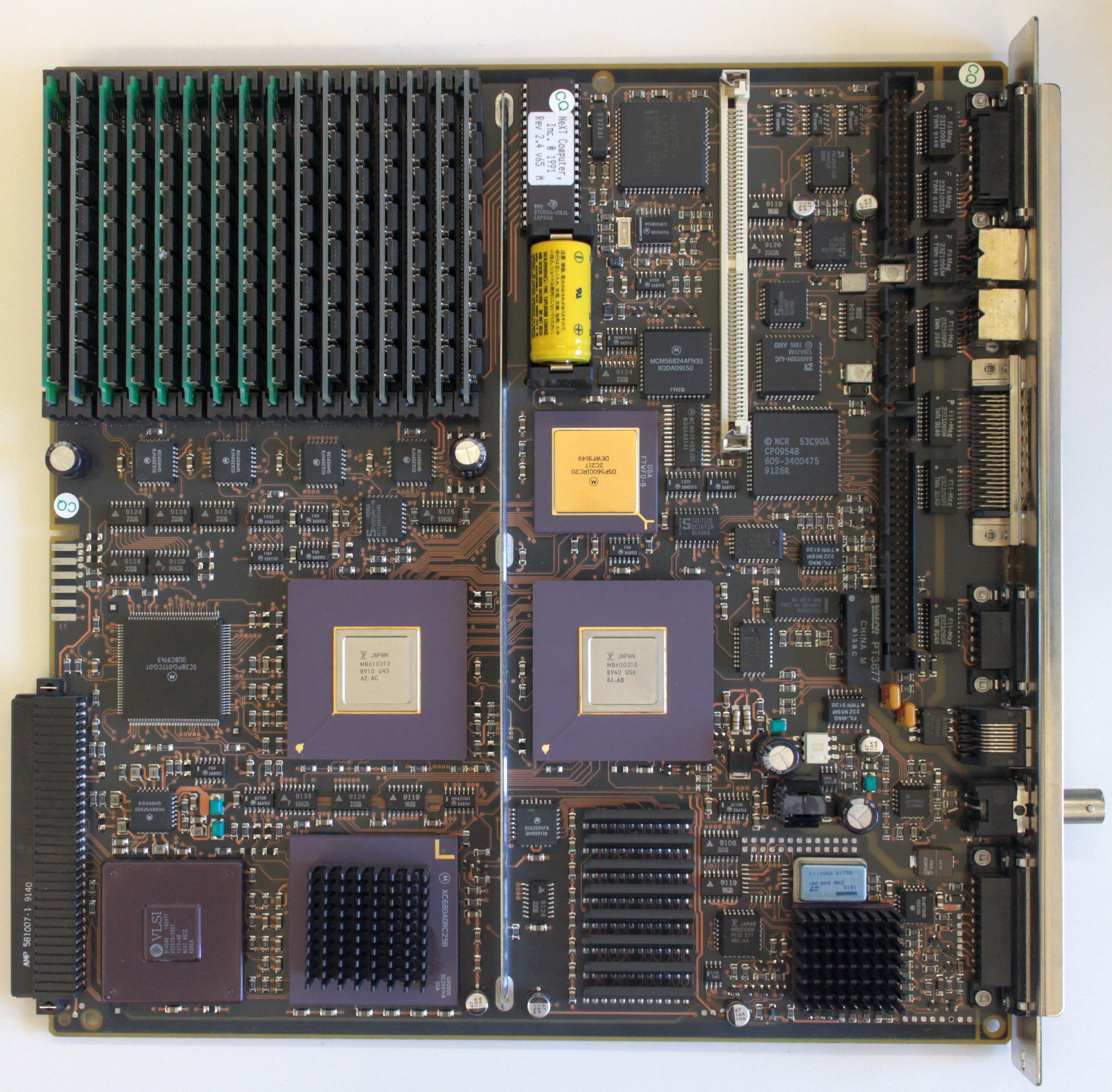
The motherboard of the NeXTcube has a Motorola 68040 at the lower edge. To the right are the interfaces, and to the left the system bus. Most chips and connectors are described in the image.

- Display: 1120×832 17 in (432 mm) 82 ppi grayscale MegaPixel Display
- Operating system: NeXTSTEP 2.2 Extended or later
- CPU: 25 MHz 68040 with integrated floating-point unit
- Digital signal processor: 25 MHz Motorola DSP56001
- RAM: 8 MB, expandable to 64 MB (Sixteen 30-pin SIMM slots)
- Floppy drive: 2.88 MB
- Hard drive: 105 MB, 340 MB, 400 MB, 660 MB, 1.4 GB or 2.8 GB SCSI drive
- Network interface: 10BASE-T and 10BASE2 Ethernet
- Expansion: four NeXTbus slots (mainboard uses one slot)
- Size (H × W × D): 12 in × 12 in × 12 in (305 mm x 305 mm x 305 mm (±1 mm))

== Legacy ==
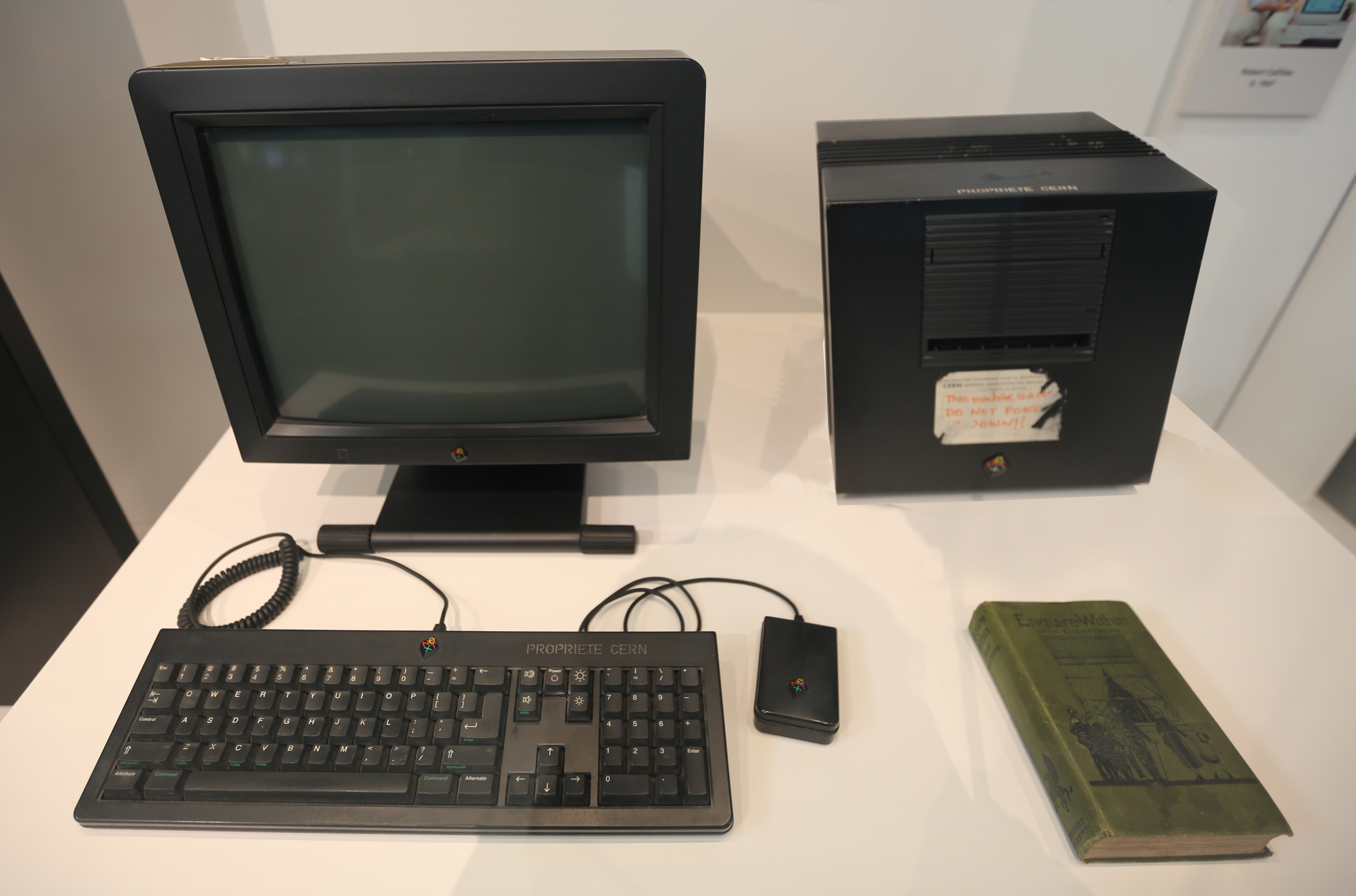
Tim Berners-Lee used this NeXTcube to create and host the World Wide Web.

Tim Berners-Lee created the World Wide Web at CERN in Switzerland on the NeXTcube workstation in 1990.

== See also ==
- NeXT character set
- NeXTcube Turbo
- NeXTstation
- Power Mac G4 Cube, a similar cube computer from Apple
