= NeXTdimension =

Accelerated 32-bit color board

- Manufacturer: NeXT
- Introduced: 1991
- Discontinued: 1993
- Cost: US$3995
- Processor: Intel i860
- Frequency: 33 MHz
- Memory: 8 to 64 MB
- Ports: DB13W3, 2 x S-Video, 2 x composite video
- Color: 32-bit
- Dots per inch: 96

The NeXTdimension (ND) is an accelerated 32-bit color board manufactured and sold by NeXT from 1991 that gives the NeXTcube color graphics capabilities. It is a NeXTBus (NuBus-like) full size card for the NeXTcube, filling one of the four slots in the machine, another one being used by the original CPU board. The list price for a NeXTdimension sold as an add-on to the NeXTcube was US$3,995 (equivalent to $9,220 in 2024), and another $2,995 (equivalent to $6,910 in 2024) for the MegaPixel Color Display.

== Description ==
The NeXTdimension is based on the Intel i860 64-bit RISC processor running at 33 MHz. A stripped down Mach kernel was ported to the i860, and the system's software runs under that kernel. It includes 8 MB main memory (expandable to 64 MB via eight 72-pin SIMM slots) and 4 MB VRAM for a resolution of 1120x832 at 24-bit color plus 8-bit alpha channel. The resulting system is so fast that it produces 24-bit color graphics faster than the original system's 2-bit greyscale. Output is via a DB13W3 RGB connection to a monitor, and also includes S-Video input and output. Because the host computer's main board includes the greyscale video logic, each NeXTdimension allows the simultaneous use of an additional monitor. Up to three NeXTdimension cards could be installed in a single machine, but they would have to be connected to separate monitors.

The NeXTdimension was originally designed to run the entire Display PostScript (DPS) system on the i860, offloading the rendering of DPS to pixels to the card. Rendering with DPS is a two-step process, the commands like "draw line" and "fill area" are first parsed and then rendered into pixel data in a frame buffer. Placing the parser logic on the card relieves the system's main Motorola 68040 from the rendering task, freeing time for other duties. This functionality was not completed in time for release, and development was never completed. As a result, much of the system's theoretical performance was never realized. Performance was further improved by using dual-ported VRAM as the buffer, allowing the i860 to update the display at the same time the analog video hardware was reading it out to the screen, avoiding wait states.

When it was first announced, the system was to also include a C-Cube CL550 chip for MJPEG video compression, but an estimated three-month delay in delivering the CL550 caused NeXT to redesign the product without it and instead adding a connector to accept a daughterboard providing image compression functionality. Few engineering prototypes for the MJPEG daughterboard exist.

The card also included two S-video ports and two composite video ports, which could output up to 640 x 480 video in NTSC format, as well as be used as inputs. If equipped with the CL550, the system was to have supported a single 640 x 480 window running 30 frames per second video output, significantly higher resolution than the Apple QuickTime system, introduced the same year, which used only the internal CPU and graphics hardware.

NeXTdimension
Outputs	Inputs
13W3	Composite (2x)
S-Video	S-Video
RGB using EGA 9-pin D-shell	

== See also ==
- NeXT character set
- NeXTcube
