= DB13W3 =

Video interface connector

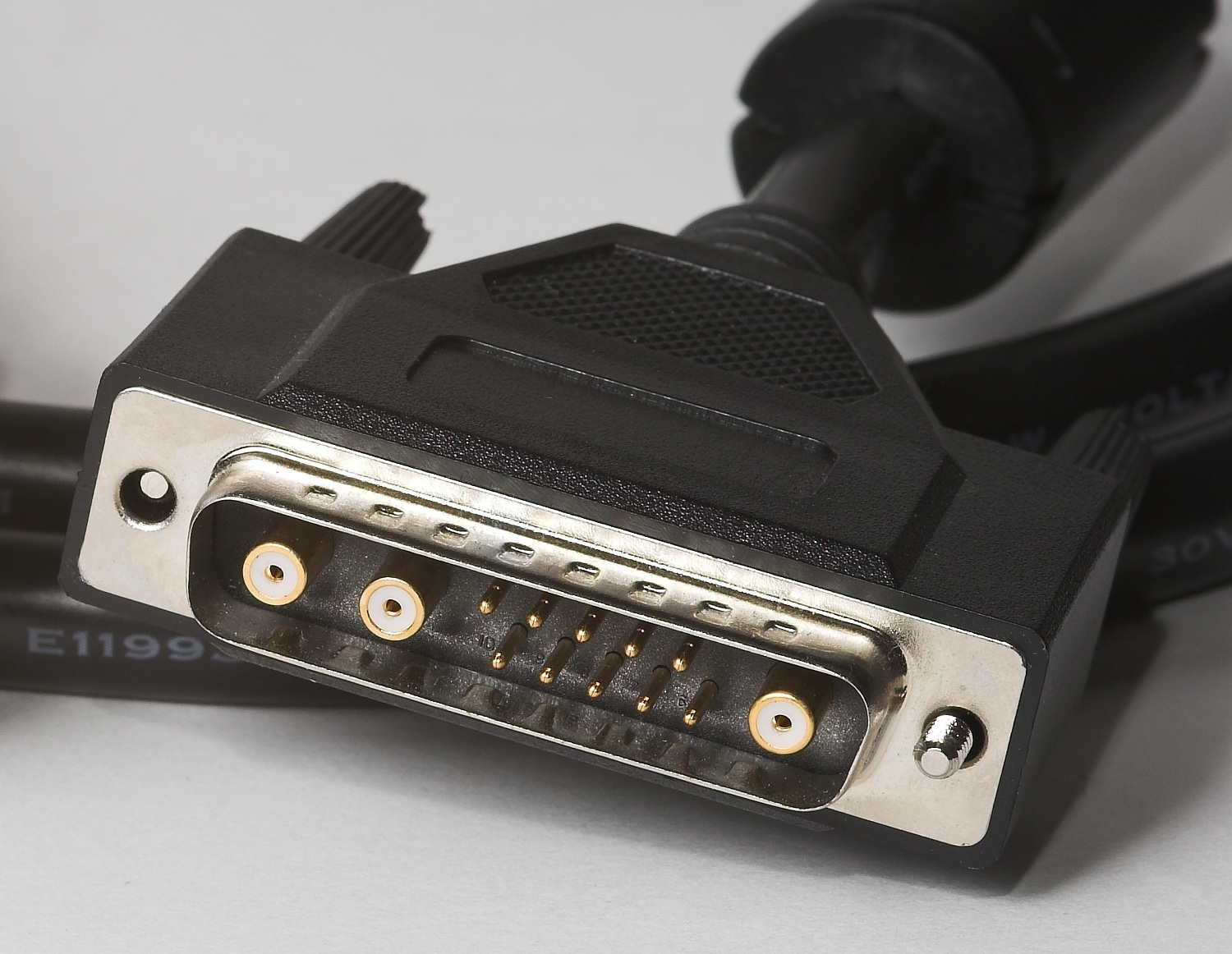
- Male 13W3 plug
- Type: Computer video connector
- Superseded by: Analog interfaces such as VGA and DVI-A and digital interfaces such as DVI-D, HDMI and DisplayPort

General specifications
- Hot pluggable: Yes
- External: Yes
- Video signal: Analogue RGB or monochrome
- Pins: 13

Pinout
Pin	Sun	SGI/ DCC
Pin 1	Ground/ DDC-SCL	Monitor ID bit 3/ Data clock (SCL)
Pin 2	Vertical sync/ NC	Monitor ID bit 0/ Bi-directional data (SDA)
Pin 3	Sense #2/ NC	Composite sync/ Composite sync
Pin 4	Sense ground/ DDC ground	Horizontal drive/ Horizontal sync
Pin 5	Composite sync	Vertical drive/ Vertical sync
Pin 6	Horizontal sync/ DDC-SDA	Monitor ID bit 1/ DDC (+5V input)
Pin 7	Ground/ VSYNC	Monitor ID bit 2/ DDC ground
Pin 8	Sense #1/ NC	Digital ground/ Ground
Pin 9	Sense #0 /NC	Digital ground/ Ground
Pin 10	Composite ground	Sync ground/ Ground
A1	Red	Red
A2	Green (gray for monochrome)	Green (gray for monochrome)
A3	Blue	Blue

DB13W3 (13W3) is a style of D-subminiature connector used for analog video interfaces. The 13 refers to the total number of pins, the W refers to workstation and the 3 refers to the number of high-frequency pins. The connector became a pseudo-standard for high-end graphical workstations from the early 1990s to the early 2000s.

== Usage ==
=== Video ===
The 13W3 connector became a pseudo-standard for high-end graphical workstations from the early 1990s to the early 2000s. Among its primary users included Sun Microsystems, Silicon Graphics (SGI) and IBM (the latter for use with their RISC workstations), as well as some displays from Apple, NeXT and Intergraph.

Implementations of this connector in terms of pin-out varied widely, not only between different vendors but also between different families of workstations within the same company. This led to some complication for corporate buyers and service personnel of these workstations due to peripherals and accessories floating in the marketplace that offered these connectors while intended for only one family of workstations. The intentionally closed ecosystem of displays and peripherals for workstations prevented this from becoming a major issue; nonetheless, some companies such as Mitsubishi, Eiki, and Samsung offered third-party displays (and even projectors) for such graphical workstations.

The 13W3 connector is no longer used with modern displays, having been considered a legacy connector since at least 2006. Among the last commercial products sold with the connector were KVM switches. It was superseded for use with analog displays by the VGA connector, and as the display market has moved to digital flat panel displays that has in turn been replaced almost entirely by digital connections (DVI, HDMI, or DisplayPort).

=== Non-video ===
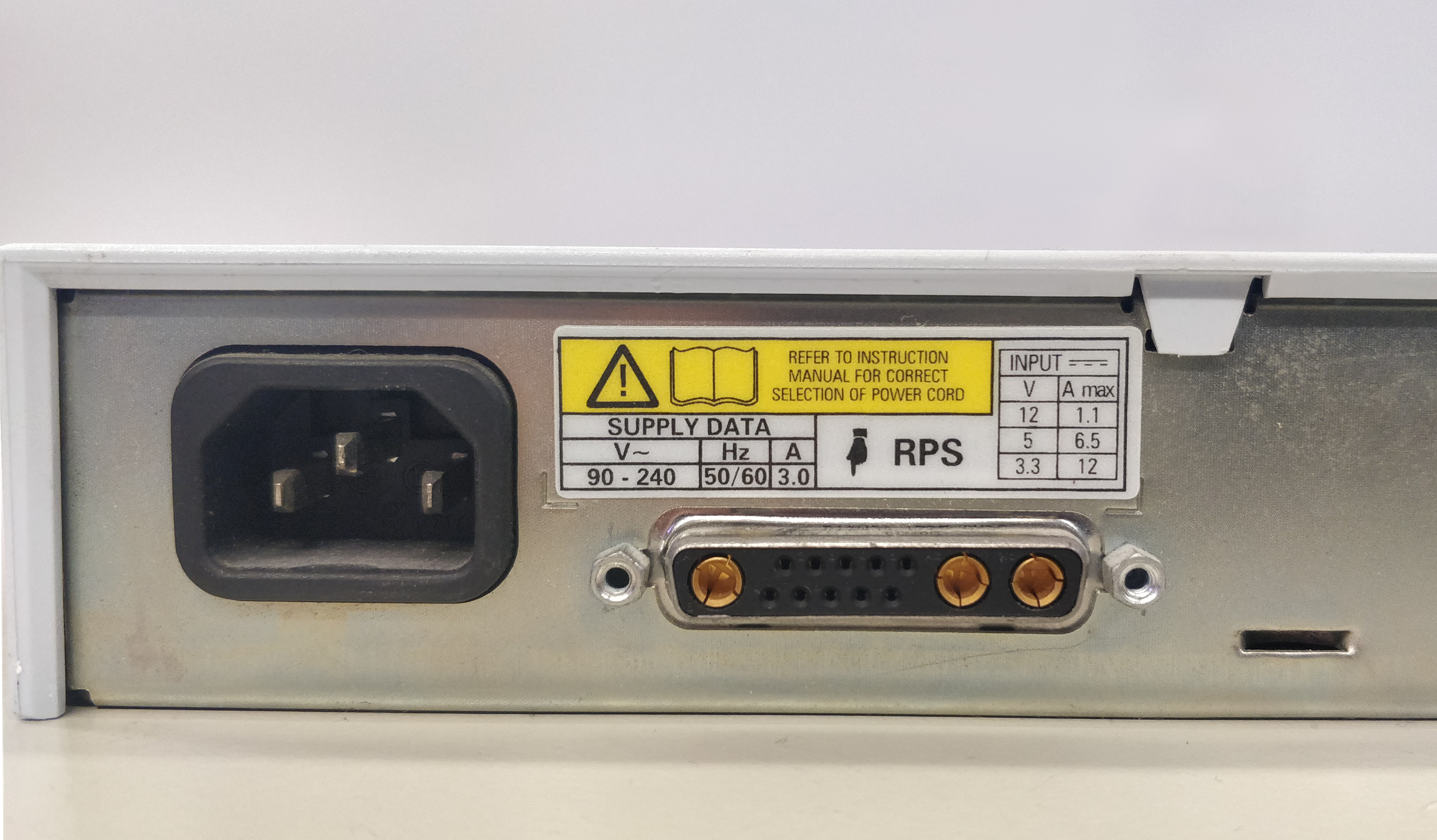
The backside of 3Com switch with a DB13W3 connector

A variant of the DB13W3 connector, with high-current pins instead of the high-frequency pins used for video applications, is also used by some 3Com SuperStack Ethernet switches to carry DC power.

It has also been used in various industrial appliances.

== Specifications ==
The DB13W3 connector has 10 standard contacts and three coaxial cavities. In Sun systems, the three coaxial contacts carry analog red, green, and blue video signals.

== See also ==
- List of display interfaces
