= Default =

Default may refer to:

== Law ==
- Default (law), the failure to do something required by law
  - Default (finance), failure to satisfy the terms of a loan obligation or failure to pay back a loan
  - Default judgment, a binding judgment in favor of either party based on some failure to take action by the other party
  - Default rule, a rule of law that can be overridden by a contract, trust, will, or other legally effective agreement

== Science, technology ==
- Default (computer science), a preset setting or value that will be used if no choice is done during program use or installation and setup
- Default password, allows the device to be accessed during its initial setup, or after resetting to factory defaults
- defaults (software), a command line utility for plist (preference) files for macOS and GNUstep

== Music ==
- "Default" (Atoms for Peace song), 2012
- Default (band), a Canadian post-grunge and alternative rock band
- "Default" (Django Django song), 2012
- By Default, a 2016 album by Band of Skulls

== Other uses ==
- Default (2014 film), an American action thriller film
- Default (2018 film), a South Korean drama film
- Default (tennis), a disqualification in the game of tennis

== See also ==
- Walkover or win by default, in sport
