= C string =

C string may refer to:

- Null-terminated string, known as a C string or C-style string due to its use by the C programming language
- C string handling, C functions to work with null-terminated strings
- C-string (clothing), a specific type of thong, or a brand of women shorts
- C string, a string instrument string (music)

== See also ==
- CString, a C string representation in the Microsoft Foundation Class Library (MFC)
