= Brad Cox =

American computer scientist (1944–2021)

Brad J. Cox (May 2, 1944) was an American computer scientist who was known mostly for creating the Objective-C programming language with his business partner Tom Love and for his work in software engineering (specifically software reuse) and software componentry.

== Biography ==
Cox received his Bachelor of Science Degree in Organic Chemistry and Mathematics from Furman University, and his Ph.D. from the Department of Mathematical Biology at the University of Chicago. Among his first known software projects, he wrote a PDP-8 program for simulating clusters of neurons.

He worked at the National Institutes of Health and Woods Hole Oceanographic Institute before moving into the software profession.

Although Cox invented his own programming language, Objective-C, which he used in his early career, he stated in an interview for the Masterminds of Programming book that he wasn't interested in programming languages but rather in software components, and he regarded languages as mere tools for building and combining parts of software.

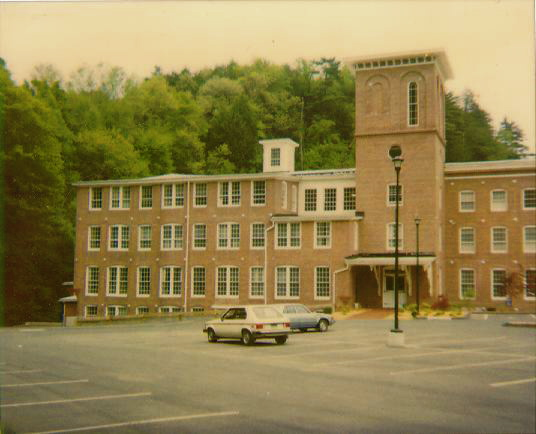
The former firehose factory at 75 Glen Road, Sandy Hook, Connecticut, where the Stepstone company was housed in the late 1980s, founded by Brad Cox and Tom Love for releasing the Objective-C programming language

Cox was also an entrepreneur, having founded the Stepstone company together with Tom Love, established to release the first Objective-C implementation. Stepstone folded in 1994 and in April 1995, NeXT acquired the Objective-C trademark and rights from Stepstone. At the same time, Stepstone licensed back from NeXT the right to continue selling their Objective-C based products. As Apple Computer acquired NeXT a year later, they now hold the rights to Objective-C. Stepstone appears to have gone out of business in the early 2000s.

== Awards ==
- Online course "Taming the Electronic Frontier" won a Paul Allen Distance Education Award ($25,000) in 1998.

== Books ==
- Object Oriented Programming: An Evolutionary Approach. Addison Wesley. 1991. ISBN 0-201-54834-8.
- Superdistribution: Objects as Property on the Electronic Frontier. Addison Wesley. 1996. ISBN 0-201-50208-9.
