= AfterStep =

Stacking window manager for the X Window System

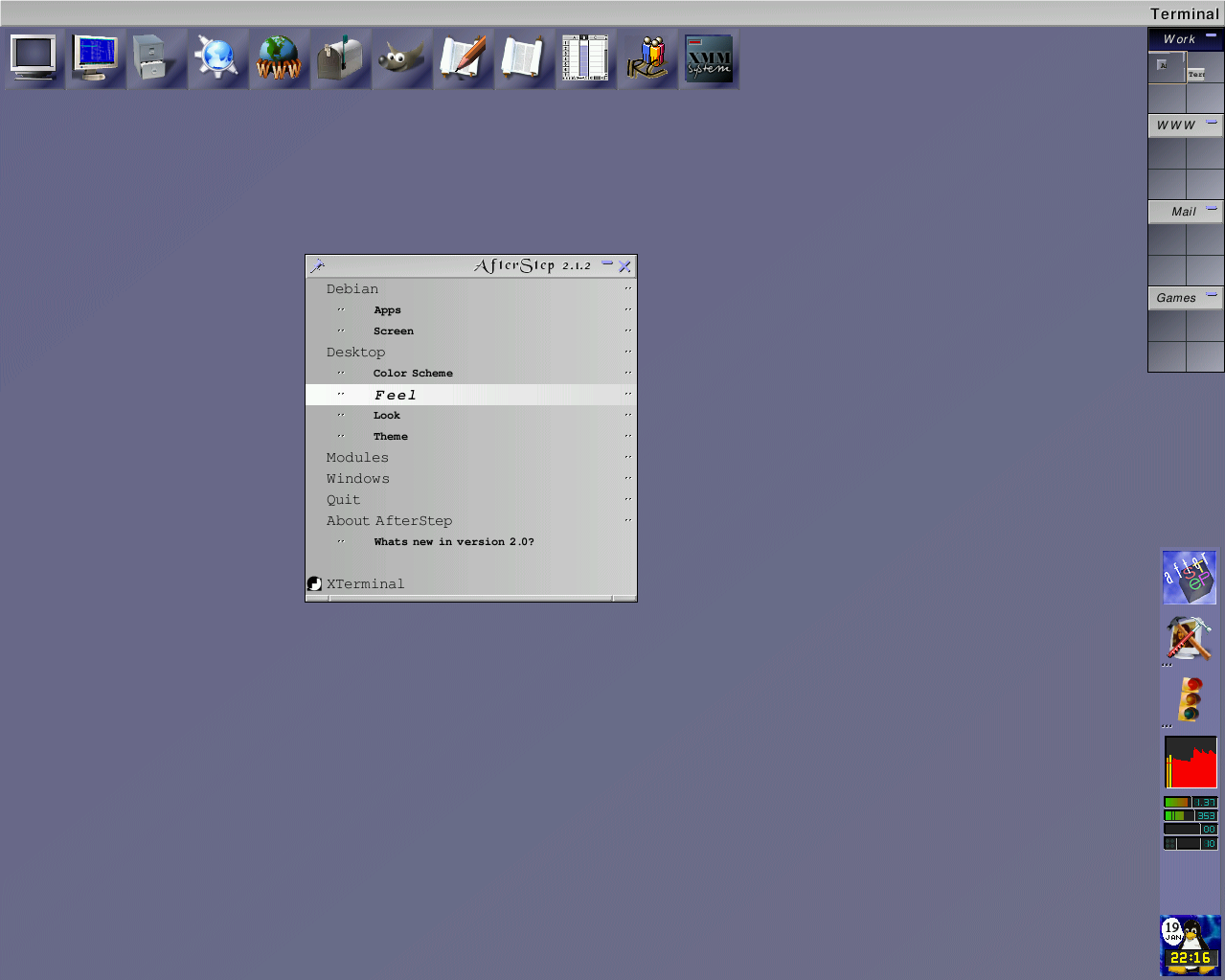
- Screenshot of an AfterStep desktop.
- Release: 2000-04-25
- Stable release: 2.2.12 / 10 June 2013
- Written in: C
- Operating system: Unix-like
- Type: Window manager
- License: 2.x: MIT; 1.x: GPL-2.0-or-later
- Website: www.afterstep.org
- Repository: github.com/afterstep/afterstep

AfterStep is a stacking window manager for the X Window System. The goal of AfterStep's development is to provide for flexibility of desktop configuration, improved aesthetics and efficient use of system resources, and was used in such distributions as MachTen. AfterStep originally was a variant of FVWM modified to resemble NeXTSTEP, but as the development cycle progressed, it diverged from its FVWM roots. In 2000, Linux website TuxRadar selected AfterStep as one of the year's best window managers, praising it as "fast and reliable, with a huge range of configuration options and the ability to create some spectacular themes".

== Features ==
Features of the AfterStep window manager include:

- Stacking windows
- Written in C
- Window decorations include borders and titlebars
- Titlebars have buttons for menu, minimize, maximize and close
- Active applications can be displayed in a taskbar via the winlist module
- Uses the GTK+ toolkit
- Support for modules
- Support for multiple desktops
- Desktop switching via a pager module
- Dependent on Perl and ImageMagick

== Modules ==
AfterStep includes several modules such as:

- Pager - a visual tool for managing and cycling between multiple desktops
- WinList - a simple Taskbar displaying active applications
- Wharf - docking tool that manages Applets/Dockapps and launches application.

AfterStep also supports virtual screens, and relies on a set of text-based configuration files for customizing its appearance.

AfterStep is maintained by a small community of developers with Sasha Vasko serving as project manager.

== See also ==
- GNUstep
- Window Maker
- OpenStep
- LiteStep
