= Dockapps =

Window Maker Dock with the dockapps wmclock, wmmon, wmapmload and wmusic

Dockapps are computer programs that have a tiny graphical interface, the size of an icon. They typically reside in a part of the user interface known as the dock, alongside icons of applications that are inactive.

Their small size makes dockapps well-suited for monitoring applications that update the icon window with low-priority information. Some applications are:

- Displaying CPU usage
- Displaying computer temperatures
- Displaying network or disk-usage statistics
- Displaying clocks, calendars, moon phases, or weather reports

== Support ==
Support for dockapps has been present in Window Maker since 1998. In early 1999 a Dock App Wharehouse hosts 54 open-source dockapps. Other window managers quickly followed. In AfterStep in the wharf. In Blackbox and derivatives in the slit. As of 2024, dockapps.net hosts 211 open-source dockapps in 14 categories. Usually their names start with 'wm' to distinguish them from non-dockapp applications.

Dedicated software libraries exist to support developing a dockapp:

- libdockapp parses the command line and does events, pixmaps and shapes.
- General Applet Interface is one API for Dockapp, Gnome 2 panel and Rox panel.
- Ruby-DockApp is a Ruby library for making DockApps.

== Protocol ==
For an application window to be recognized as a dockapp, a protocol must be followed. The ICCCM specifies the WM_HINTS property, which applications must set. It communicates the desired initial state of a window to the window manager. Common values are Normal and Iconic. For a dockapp, that state must be set to Withdrawn. The WM_HINTS also specifies the icon window to be used. Commonly, it has a dimension of 64 by 64 pixels.

In 2010, a second method was added to Window Maker. When the Class part of the WM_CLASS property is set to 'DockApp', the window is also recognized as a dockapp. The motivation was that in GTK it is impossible to create windows in the Withdrawn state. This method was also adopted by other window managers, like AfterStep, Fluxbox, Ion, Openbox and IceWM.

== See also ==
- Dock (computing)
- Applet
