= GNUMail =

Mail client for GNUstep

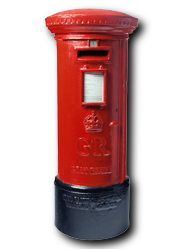

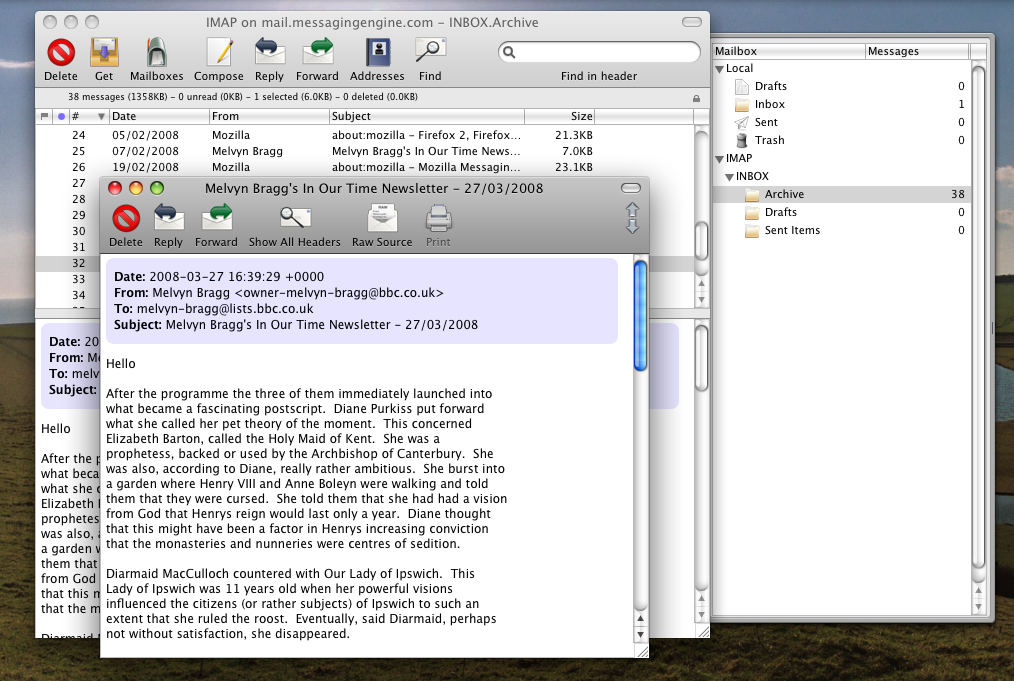
- GNUMail on Mac OS X
- Original authors: Ludovic Marcotte and others
- Developer: Collaboration World
- Stable release: 1.4.0 / February 23, 2023; 2 years ago
- Written in: Objective-C
- Operating system: Cross-platform: (macOS, Linux, NetBSD, OpenBSD, FreeBSD, Oracle_Solaris)
- Platform: IA-32 x86-64 PowerPC SPARC MIPS ARM
- Available in: multiple languages
- Type: E-mail client
- License: GNU General Public License
- Website: www.nongnu.org/gnustep-nonfsf/gnumail/
- Repository: svn.savannah.gnu.org/viewvc/gnustep-nonfsf/apps/gnumail/

GNUMail is a free and open-source, cross-platform e-mail client based on GNUstep or Cocoa. It is the official mail client of GNUstep and is also used in Étoilé. It was inspired by NeXTMail (NeXT's Mail.app), the predecessor of Apple Mail. GNUMail is based on the mail handling framework Pantomime. GNUMail demonstrated that it is possible to develop cross platform programs for GNUstep and Cocoa.

== Features ==
- Supported protocols: POP3 (with APOP support), IMAP4 and UNIX; SMTP
- Supports TLS with all protocols
- Mail spool file support for receiving
- File formats for local saving: Maildir, Berkeley mbox
- Filters for incoming and outgoing mail which support regular expressions
- Thread Arcs for email thread visualization and navigation
- Find Panel supporting regular expressions
- Ability to add custom mailheaders
- Native support for PGP/GPG encryption

== See also ==
- Comparison of email clients
