= Miller columns =

Visualization of tree-type data structures

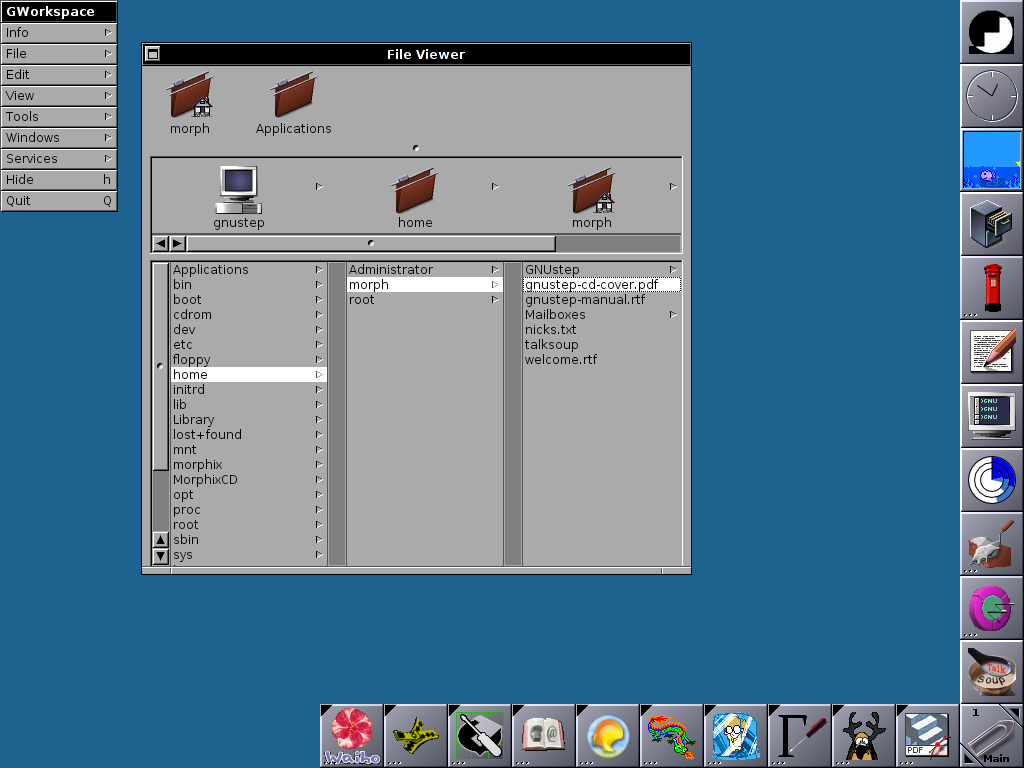
A Miller Column browser as implemented by GNUstep. It incorporates a Shelf.

Miller columns (also known as cascading lists) are a browsing/visualization technique that can be applied to tree structures. The columns allow multiple levels of the hierarchy to be open at once, and provide a visual representation of the current location. It is closely related to techniques used earlier in the Smalltalk browser, but was independently invented by Mark S. Miller in 1980 at Yale University. The technique was then used at Project Xanadu, Datapoint, and NeXT.

While at Datapoint, Miller generalized the technique to browse directed graphs with labeled nodes and arcs. In all cases, the technique is appropriate for structures with high degree (large fanout). For low-degree structures, outline editors or graph viewers are more effective.

== History ==
Miller columns are most well known today as the “Columns view” mode of the macOS Finder, as well as the "Browser" view in iTunes. The columns in Finder descend directly from the NeXTSTEP File Viewer's use of Miller columns going back to 1986. The GNUstep project continues to offer a Miller column browser that closely follows the NeXT approach, bringing the advantages of a column browser to Linux, BSD, and other operating systems with large tree structures. The iPod's browsing of categories and audio file tag attributes is reminiscent of column browsing, although only one column is visible at a time.

== Issues ==
Miller columns have several issues from a usability standpoint:

- Deeper and deeper navigation into directory structures is represented by fitting more and more columns into the display, eventually making each column too narrow to read without scrolling horizontally; the need for scrolling can be reduced or eliminated by using the keyboard to navigate through directories instead of the pointer
- Sort options and metadata display are limited, though this can be mitigated by changing the view of the current directory when appropriate either using the pointer or a keyboard shortcut and, as in the macOS Finder and file dialogs, metadata can be seen in a preview column when a file is selected instead of a directory

== Use in file browsers ==
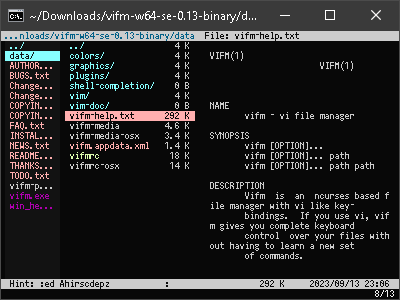
ncurses-based file manager vifm featuring Miller columns

- The macOS Finder, the default file browser on macOS, uses Miller columns in its "Columns" view.
- The open and save file dialogs in macOS also use Miller columns.
- Path Finder is a shareware file browser for Mac OS X supporting Miller column view amongst others.
- GWorkspace, a workspace manager for GNUstep which can be used as file browser, uses Miller columns.
- ranger, a terminal-based file browser with Vi-like key bindings, uses a multi-column mode similar to Miller columns.
- lf (as in "list files") is a terminal file manager written in Go with a heavy inspiration from ranger file manager.
- evidence, an apparently obsolete file browser for Enlightenment, used Miller columns in its “browser-view”.
- Thunar, the default file browser for Xfce, used to have a branch called “columns-view” which was given up later.
- Dolphin, the default file browser of KDE, also canceled the further development of Miller columns due to the source code being too complex – making it difficult to maintain. It is expected to be added again in either the 26.12 or 27.04 releases.
- Tkdesk, a file browser for the X Window System, uses Miller columns.
- Marlin is a file browser written in GTK 3 which implements Miller columns. Marlin does not have any download files registered with Launchpad as of November 2016.
- Pantheon Files (or just Files, for short) is a fork of Marlin actively developed by the Elementary team.
- FSViewer is an obsolete file browser for Window Maker using Miller columns.
- Greg's Browser is an NeXT-inspired column browser for the Classic Mac OS.
- WinBrowser and Ultraexplorer are file browsers for Microsoft Windows supporting Miller columns.
- One Commander is a file browser for Microsoft Windows using automatically scaled Miller columns in a tabbed interface.
- ThatFile is a file browser for Microsoft Windows with Miller columns. It additionally has tools to optimize user workflow.
- Direttore File Manager is a file browser for Microsoft Windows 10 using Miller columns in one of its views.
- Yet another Windows file manager that supports Miller columns is xplorer2.
- The storage explorer on the Supabase dashboard uses Miller columns in its "columns" view.
- Directory Opus for Windows uses Miller Columns called FlatView to display hierarchy directory structures as Mixed or Grouped files and folders or Mixed files with no folders. FlatView display columns can be sized, sorted and filtered to display specific types of files or directories.
- Whale, a file manager for KDE has support for Miller columns
- Files, a file manager for Windows

== See also ==
- Shelf: NeXT GUI element that can be combined with columns to make a file manager.
