= New York Belting and Packing Co. =

- U.S. National Register of Historic Places
- U.S. Historic district
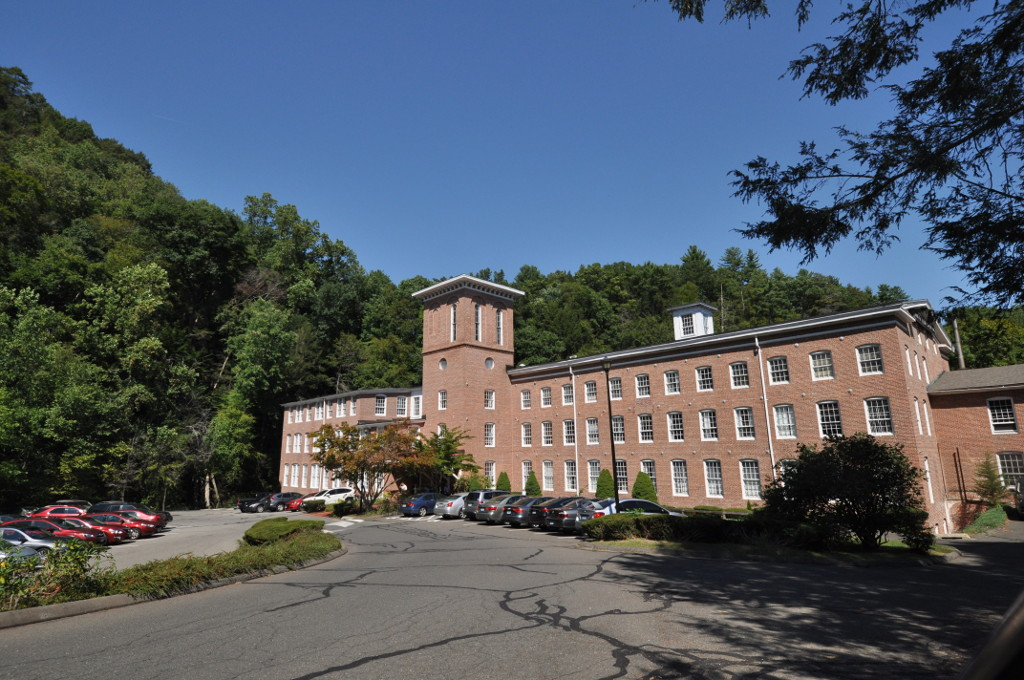

- Location within Connecticut Location within the United States
- Location: 45-71 and 79-89 Glen Road, Newtown, Connecticut
- Coordinates: 41°25′52″N 73°16′42″W
- Area: 12.8 acres (5.2 ha)
- Built: 1856
- Architect: Ley, Fred T. & Co.
- Architectural style: Italianate
- NRHP reference No.: 82004367
- Added to NRHP: June 2, 1982

The New York Belting and Packing Co. complex, also known locally for its main 20th-century occupant, the Fabric Fire Hose Company, is a historic industrial complex at 45–71, 79-89 Glen Road in Newtown, Connecticut. Its centerpiece is a four-story brick mill building with an Italianate tower, built in 1856. The property also includes a dam impounding the adjacent Pootatuck River, a mill pond, and a hydroelectric power generation facility.

The site's industrial history begins about 1850, when the dam was built. The Goodyear Rubber Packing Company, headed by Josiah Tomlinson, brother-in-law of Charles Goodyear, started operations on the site at that time, but the company went bankrupt in 1856. The New York Belting and Packing Company bought the premises in that year. One of the buildings burned down that year, and the company built the present factory building on that site, as well as another further upstream (no longer extant), where it operated until 1917. The property was then acquired by a subsidiary of the United States Rubber Company (later known as Uniroyal), which leased the premises to the Fabric Fire Hose Company until 1977. It was added to the National Register of Historic Places in 1982.

The complex was renovated into an office building in 1980 named Rocky Glen Mill. A notable occupant in the late 1980s was Stepstone, which created the Objective-C programming language. The building was renovated again in 2000.

== See also ==
- National Register of Historic Places listings in Fairfield County, Connecticut
