= Shelf (computing) =

The Shelf is an interface feature in NeXTSTEP and OPENSTEP, and is used as a repository to store links to commonly used files, directories and programs, and as a temporary "holding" place to move/copy files and directories around in the file system hierarchy. In macOS, items may be dragged onto the sidebar area of the Finder, but these do not behave as placeholders and cannot be manipulated in the below manner.

The dynamics of the Shelf in file system operations can be illustrated by comparison with the metaphor used in the Microsoft Windows operating systems. In order to move a file the following steps may be taken:

- the window containing the source folder is opened
- the window containing the destination folder is opened
- the desired file in the source directory is dragged to the destination folder

With the NeXT operating systems, in addition to moving files by dragging them from window to window, the following method can be used:

- the user navigates to the source directory
- the file is dragged to the Shelf
- the user navigates to the destination directory
- the file is dragged from the Shelf to the destination directory

Note that the file, when dragged to the Shelf, has not moved anywhere and is not changed in any way. The Shelf icon is merely a placeholder for the file. In moving the placeholder off the shelf, the actual action occurs.

The NeXT functionality builds upon this concept by allowing the destination directory to be put on the Shelf as well, and the file can be merely dragged to the destination directory icon.

The process is similar to the Microsoft Windows functionality of copying or cutting file system objects (a file or files, a folder or folders, or a combination of both) to the clipboard; the objects are not copied or removed from their original location until the paste operation to the new location is completed. The Shelf concept, though older, is more powerful in that the file system objects, their sources and destinations are persistent and available as long as they are on the Shelf (in the Windows cut, copy, and paste metaphor the objects and locations persist until one copy/move operation is complete or until something else is placed in the clipboard).

Since Shelf icons are 'placeholders' of sorts, icons can be put on the Shelf representing commonly used directories, and commonly used programs can be put on the Shelf as well.

The NeXTSTEP and OPENSTEP file management application (called FileViewer and run by the Workspace Manager) also allowed users to have different shelves associated with particular directories. Users simply opened a new browser rooted in a particular subdirectory, and that browser window would show the corresponding shelf, allowing users to have many different shelves based on whatever folder hierarchy they happened to be using to organize their files.

== See also ==
- Miller columns
- Clipboard (computing)
