= GNUstep =

Open source widget toolkit and application development tools

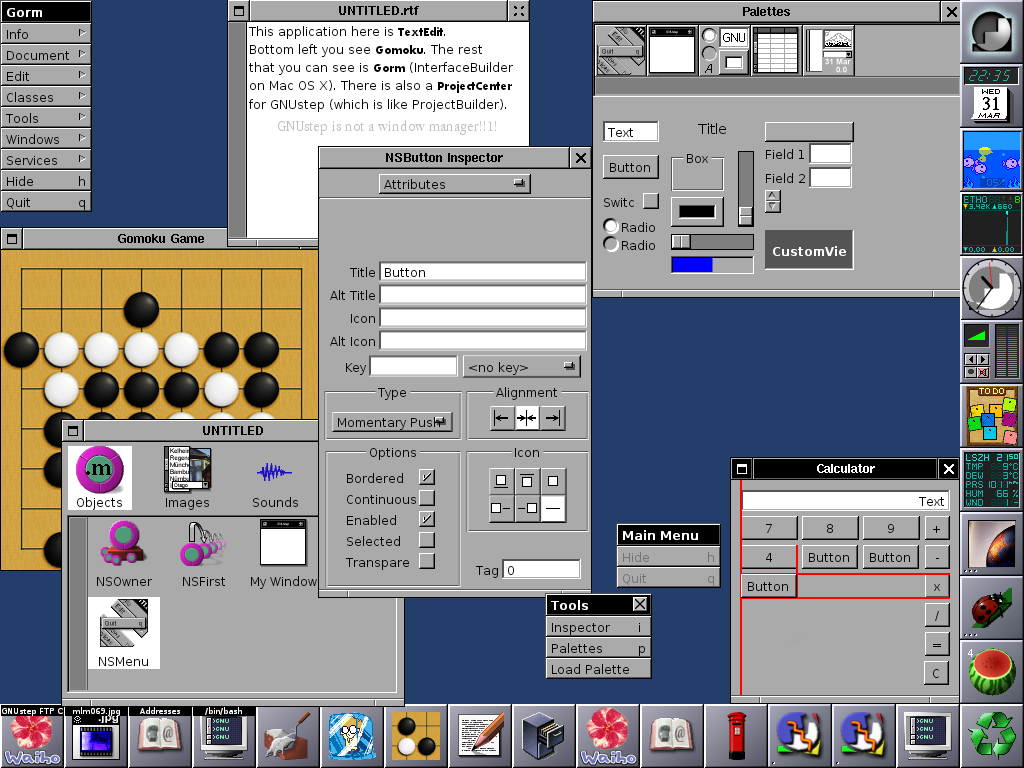
- Window Maker and a variety of applications were developed with the GNUstep libraries, including a gomoku game, calculator, and TextEdit.
- Developer: GNUstep Developers
- Stable release: make 2.9.3, base 1.31.1, gui 0.32.0, back 0.32.0 / February 28, 2025; 17 months ago
- Preview release: on the GitHub software repository
- Written in: Objective-C
- Operating system: Cross-platform
- Type: Widget toolkit
- License: GNU General Public License for the applications GNU Lesser General Public License for the libraries.
- Website: www.gnustep.org
- Repository: github.com/gnustep

GNUstep is a free software implementation of the Cocoa (formerly OpenStep) Objective-C frameworks, widget toolkit, and application development tools for Unix-like operating systems and Microsoft Windows. It is part of the GNU Project.

GNUstep features a cross-platform, object-oriented IDE. Apart from the default Objective-C interface, GNUstep also has bindings for Java, Ruby, GNU Guile and Scheme. The GNUstep developers track some additions to Apple's Cocoa to remain compatible. The roots of the GNUstep application interface are the same as the roots of Cocoa: NeXTSTEP and OpenStep. GNUstep thus predates Cocoa, which emerged when Apple acquired NeXT's technology and incorporated it into the development of the original Mac OS X, while GNUstep was initially an effort by GNU developers to replicate the technically ambitious NeXTSTEP's programmer-friendly features.

== History ==
GNUstep began when Paul Kunz and others at Stanford Linear Accelerator Center wanted to port HippoDraw from NeXTSTEP to another platform. Instead of rewriting HippoDraw from scratch and reusing only the application design, they decided to rewrite the NeXTSTEP object layer on which the application depended. This was the first version of libobjcX. It enabled them to port HippoDraw to Unix systems running the X Window System without changing a single line of their application source. After the OpenStep specification was released to the public in 1994, they decided to write a new objcX which would adhere to the new APIs. The software would become known as "GNUstep".

== Software architecture ==
Software components of the Linux desktop include the display server, graphics control element libraries, and graphical shells.

The Foundation Kit provides basic classes such as wrapper classes and data structure classes. The Application Kit provides classes oriented around graphical user interface capabilities. GNUstep contains a set of graphical control elements written in the Objective-C programming language.

The graphical user interface (GUI) of GNUMail is composed of graphics control elements. GNUMail has to interact with the windowing system, e.g. X11 or Wayland, and its graphical user interface has to be rendered. GNUstep's backend provides a small set of functions used by the user interface library to interface to the actual windowing system. It also has a rendering engine which emulates common Postscript functions. The package gnustep-back provides the following backends:

- cairo – default backend using the Cairo 2D graphics library.
- winlib – default backend on Microsoft Windows systems. Cairo and Windows API variants.
- art – old (deprecated) backend on unix-like systems. Uses the vector-based PostScript-like 2D graphics library Libart.
- xlib – old (deprecated) X11 backend.

GNUstep inherits some design principles proposed in OPENSTEP (GNUstep predates Cocoa, but Cocoa is based on OPENSTEP) as well as the Objective-C language.

- Model–view–controller paradigm
- Target–action
- Drag-and-drop
- Delegation
- Message forwarding (through NSInvocation)

In addition to the Objective-C interface, some small projects under the GNUstep umbrella implement other APIs from Apple:

- The Boron library aims to implement the Carbon API. It is very incomplete.
- The CoreBase library is designed to be compatible with Core Foundation. It is not complete enough for the Base (Foundation Kit) component to simply be a wrapper around it.
- The QuartzCore library implements Core Animation APIs. The Opal library implements Quartz 2D.

As of February 2020, there are no projects that build the Swift programming language against the GNUstep Objective-C environment.

== Applications ==
Here are some examples of applications written for or ported to GNUstep.

=== Original ===
- Addresses, an address/contacts manager
- Étoilé, a desktop environment
- GNUMail, an e-mail client
- GNUstep Database Library 2, an Enterprise Objects Framework clone
- GNUstepWeb, an application server compatible with WebObjects 4.x
- Gorm, a user interface builder application, and part of the developer tools of GNUstep. Gorm is the equivalent of Interface Builder that was originally found on NeXTSTEP, then OPENSTEP, and finally on Mac OS X. It supports the old .nib files as well as its own .gorm file format.
- GWorkspace, a workspace and file manager
- Grr, an RSS feed reader
- Oolite, a clone of Elite, a space simulation game with trading components
- PRICE, imaging application
- ProjectCenter, the Project Builder or Xcode equivalent.
- TalkSoup, an IRC client
- Terminal
- Zipper, a file archiver tool
- Window Maker is a window manager that emulates NeXTSTEP's GUI as an OpenStep-compatible environment. It was launched in 1997 as an improved take on AfterStep's design.

=== Ported from NeXTSTEP, OPENSTEP, or macOS ===
- Adun
- BioCocoa
- Chess
- Cenon
- DoomEd
- EdenMath
- Eggplant
- Emacs
- Fortunate
- Gomoku
- NeXTGO
- PikoPixel
- TextEdit
- TimeMon

=== Forks of GNUstep ===
- Universal Windows Platform, which includes a WinObjC suite consisting of various parts of GNUstep and Microsoft's own implementations of things like the Cocoa Touch API.

== See also ==
- Darling (software), a compatibility layer that relies on GNUstep
- GNUstep fat bundle
- Miller columns, the method of file tree browsing the GWorkspace File Viewer uses
- Property list, often-used file format to store user settings
- StepTalk, scripting framework
