= Window Maker =

Window manager

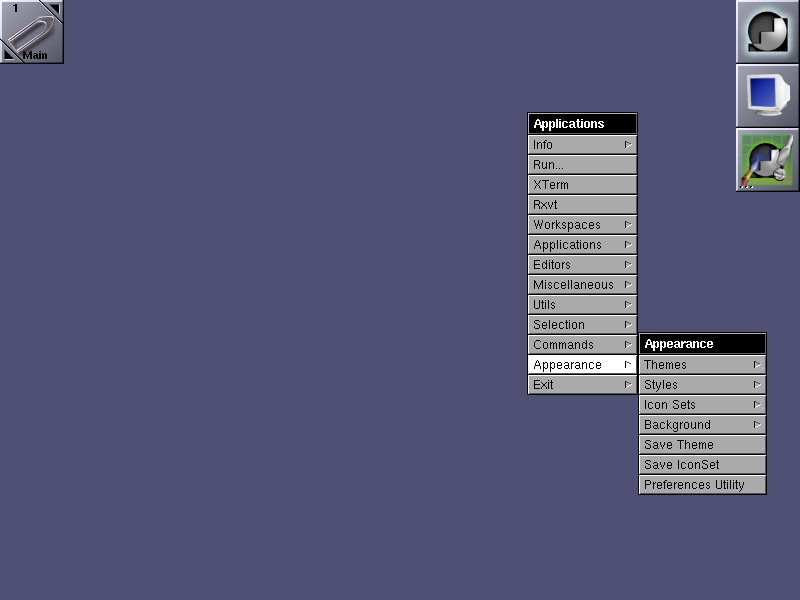
- Window Maker's default appearance
- Developer: Alfredo Kojima up to version 0.92.0, Carlos R. Mafra onwards
- Release: 1997; 29 years ago
- Stable release: 0.96.0 / 5 August 2023; 3 years ago
- Written in: C
- Operating system: Unix-like
- Type: Window manager
- License: GPL-2.0-or-later
- Website: www.windowmaker.org
- Repository: repo.or.cz/w/wmaker-crm.git

Window Maker is a free and open-source window manager for the X Window System designed to emulate NeXTSTEP's Look and feel as a GNUstep-compatible environment. It is part of the GNU Project.

== History ==
Window Maker was written from scratch primarily by Brazilian programmer Alfredo Kojima in 1997, originally intended to be used with the GNUstep desktop environment and as an improved take on the AfterStep window manager's design.

The last release under the original developers was 0.92.0 in 2005. In 2012, Window Maker 0.95.1 was released by a new maintainer, Carlos R. Mafra, who had been maintaining a fork on Git.

== Dockapps ==
Dockapps are small applications that run inside Window Maker's dock alongside application icons and are often used for monitoring applications, notification areas, and volume controls. Dockapps are also usable with other window managers, such as AfterStep and Blackbox.

The Window Maker developers maintain a dockapp directory and a Git repository with dockapps whose original development has been abandoned.

== WINGs ==
WINGs (a recursive acronym for "WINGs Is Not GNUstep") is a lightweight widget toolkit designed for Window Maker to be used instead of GNUstep, as the latter was considered overkill for a window manager, but it has seen some use by developers outside the Window Maker team.
