= David A. Jaffe =

American composer (born 1955)

David Aaron Jaffe (born April 29, 1955) is an American composer of electronic music and contemporary classical music. His compositions include over 90 pieces for orchestra, chorus, chamber ensembles, and electronic ensembles. He composed the computer music piece Silicon Valley Breakdown and published research on physical modeling of plucked and bowed strings. He also worked with Julius O. Smith to develop the Music Kit for NeXT Computers.

== Biography ==
Jaffe attended Ithaca College, where he studied violin performance and music composition, completing his composition studies with Karel Husa. He then attended Bennington College to study composition, orchestration, and counterpoint with Henry Brant and electronic music with Joel Chadabe. He received a B.A. in Music and Mathematics in 1979.

Jaffe received a doctorate in Musical Arts from Stanford in 1984, where he was part of the computer music group at the Stanford Artificial Intelligence Lab and, later, the Center for Computer Research in Music and Acoustics (CCRMA). In addition to his musical work, he researched physical modeling and ensemble timing.

== Composing career ==
Jaffe has taught composition at Stanford, the University of California, San Diego, Princeton University, and Melbourne University. Some performers of his music include the Saint Paul Chamber Orchestra, the Brooklyn Philharmonic, the San Francisco Symphony, the San Francisco Contemporary Music Players, Chanticleer, and Earplay, as well as various choruses, string quartets, and other chamber ensembles.

International music festival performances of Jaffe's music include:

- The Berlin Festival
- The Bergenfest
- The ISCM Warsaw Autumn Festival
- The Venice Biennale
- The Bourges Festival
- The American Festival in London
- The Music in the Americas festival in Buenos Aires
- The Spring in Havana Festival

Jaffe received commissions from ensembles, such as the Kronos Quartet, the Russian National Orchestra, American Guild of Organists, the Lafayette String Quartet, and Chanticleer, for whom he was the N.E.A. Composer-in-Residence in 1990. He received N.E.A. In addition to receiving N.E.A. Composer Fellowships in 1982 and 1991, Jaffe also received a California Arts Council Fellowship in 2001. Jaffe's music is published by Schott Music and Terra Non-Firma Press (BMI).

== Musical approach ==
Influences on Jaffe's musical approach are the American experimentalism composers, such as Henry Brant (a close friend and mentor), Carl Ruggles, and Charles Ives. His work draws upon a range of sources, including world music, jazz, and historical Western concert styles. His "maximalist" approach to composition earned recognition.

Many of Jaffe's works incorporate extra-musical elements and political issues, such as “No Trumpets, No Drums," based on the Israeli-Palestinian conflict.

Several of Jaffe's pieces focus on the Afro-Cuban musical tradition, including "Underground Economy" for Cuban jazz pianist Hilario Duran, with violin and interactive electronics, and “Bull’s Eye” for violin, cello, and Afro-Cuban percussion.

Jaffe is a mandolinist and violinist who performs diverse styles such as Afro-Cuban charanga, bluegrass, and klezmer, as well as his original styles. He has collaborated with bluegrass musicians, including Mike Marshall, Tony Trischka, and Vassar Clements.

== Development of Silicon Valley Breakdown ==
In 1981, Jaffe received a commission from guitarist David Starobin to compose a work for eight guitars, voice, and tape. Upon returning to Stanford in the fall of 1981, he began working on the piece, hoping to use FM synthesis to simulate plucked strings. While discussing the project with violist Alex Strong, Strong shared a new technique he had discovered. Returning to CCRMA, Jaffe and Smith began working with it and developed improvements to solve problems of tuning, dynamics, and expression.

After the premiere of “May All Your Children Be Acrobats,” which combined the new technique and the FM synthesis-based method, Jaffe created a work for four-channel tape alone, in which he further developed the plucked string synthesis technique. The resulting piece, Silicon Valley Breakdown, premiered at the Venice Biennale in 1983 and was subsequently performed in 28 countries.

At the same time, he and Smith presented a paper on the technique at the 1983 International Computer Music Conference. The Computer Music Journal, also included in The Music Machine by MIT Press, published simultaneously with the Karplus/Strong paper.

Silicon Valley Breakdown includes innovations in simulated ensemble synchronization and the development of the Time Map. This work is described in the article "Ensemble Aspects of Computer Music," published in Computer Music Journal.

The Digital Domain, one of the first compact discs ever made to showcase the new CD technology, included the finale from the piece. Elektra/Asylum released the piece in 1983. CDs, including XXIst Century Mandolin and Dinosaur Music, also include the work.

== The Radiodrum and The Seven Wonders of the Ancient World ==
Since 1990, Jaffe has written extensively for an electronic controller called the Radiodrum, developed by Bob Boie and Max Mathews as a three-dimensional mouse at Bell Labs in New Jersey. Jaffe uses the Radiodrum in such works as the Seven Wonders of the Ancient World, which Joshua Kosman of the San Francisco Chronicle praised for the "resourceful intricacy and variety of Jaffe's writing." Jaffe developed these works in close collaboration with percussionist/composer Andrew Schloss. Jaffe and Schloss describe their approach in several articles, including "The Computer-Extended Ensemble," published in Computer Music Journal in 1994.

In Racing Against Time, Jaffe used the Radiodrum-controlled electronics, two saxophones, two violins, and a piano. Jaffe used the SynthCore sound engine to synthesize physical models of electric guitar, jet fly-by, and car engine effects. Staccato Systems, Inc. designed the system, which became SoundMAX after the acquisition of Staccato Systems by Analog Devices, Inc.

More of Jaffe's ventures with Schloss include their duo Wildlife, with Jeffe on the Zeta violin and Schloss on the Radiodrum, and Underground Economy, an Afro-Cuban improvisational work using the Radiodrum.

Jaffe also worked with the Radio Baton, a close relative of the Radiodrum, which was created by computer music pioneer Max Mathews. It features in such works as Terra Non-Firma, for four cellos and Radio Baton-conducted electronics, released on the CDs "Music for Radio Drum and Radio Baton" (Centaur Records) and "Music for Instruments and Electronics by David A. Jaffe" (Well-Tempered Productions).

== The Space Between Us, a tribute to Henry Brant ==
Jaffe first met Trimpin in Seattle through Andrew Schloss, who was commissioning a work from Jaffe (with support from the Canada Arts Council) for the Radiodrum-controlled piano and string quartet. However, given the similarity to The Seven Wonders..., Jaffe wanted to transform the project into an exploration of new territory.

After Henry Brant's death, Jaffe inherited Brant's percussion instruments (18 chimes, a xylophone, and a glockenspiel). He traveled to Santa Barbara to visit Brant's widow and pack up the instruments for further shipping. Trimpin also inherited some of Brant's instruments. Jaffe approached Trimpin with a proposal to transform the Brant instruments into robotic devices. The piece took its final form when Charles Amirkhanian and Other Minds joined the commission consortium, along with a grant from the James Irvine Foundation. The instrumentation was augmented to include a second string quartet.

In The Space Between Us, the chimes are hung from the ceiling above the audience, the xylophone is split in two and placed at the extreme left and right of the stage, and the glockenspiel and a Disklavier piano are on stage. All of the percussion and piano are controlled by the Radiodrum and the strings are positioned in the aisles surrounding the audience, with two cellos at the extreme rear of the hall, followed (rear-to-front) by violas, violins II, and violins I. The work premiered on March 4, 2011, at the 2011 Other Minds Festival in San Francisco. In his program notes, Jaffe wrote that the piece "explores what can be communicated and what must remain unsaid as eight isolated string players embedded in the audience, and one percussionist alone on stage, reach out to one another." The work was subsequently performed at Open Space in Victoria, British Columbia, Canada (2013) and on the Wayward Music Series at the Good Shepherd Center in Seattle (2016). A grant from New Music USA, supported the latter.

== Music and audio software ==
From 1988 to 1991, Jaffe worked at Steve Jobs' start-up company NeXT, developing music software for the NeXT Computer. The NeXT’s 56001 DSP, which was capable of real-time sound synthesis, inspired Jaffe and Julius Smith to create a programmable environment called the Music Kit, which fused elements of Music 5 and MIDI in an object-oriented environment.

In the mid-1990s, he developed the sound for games, such as Welcome to West Feedback and Quest for Fame, collaborating with bands such as Aerosmith for the Boston-based company Ahead (later Virtual Music Entertainment). These games used a custom guitar controller and pick called the vPick and were precursors to products such as Guitar Hero.

In the late 1990s, he co-founded Staccato Systems and developed the SynthCore sound engine. Analog Devices acquired Staccato Systems in 2001, where Jaffe continued as Chief Architect and developed SoundMAX, which shipped on over 80 million PCs, and VisualAudio, which was presented at the 2006 Audio Engineering Society Conference in New York City. This work resulted in several patents.

Since 2006, Jaffe is a Senior Scientist/Engineer at Universal Audio, where he has helped develop the DSP systems used in the UAD-2 and Apollo hardware.
