= NeXT =

American technology company (1985–1997)

NeXT, Inc.
- The corporate logo, designed by Paul Rand

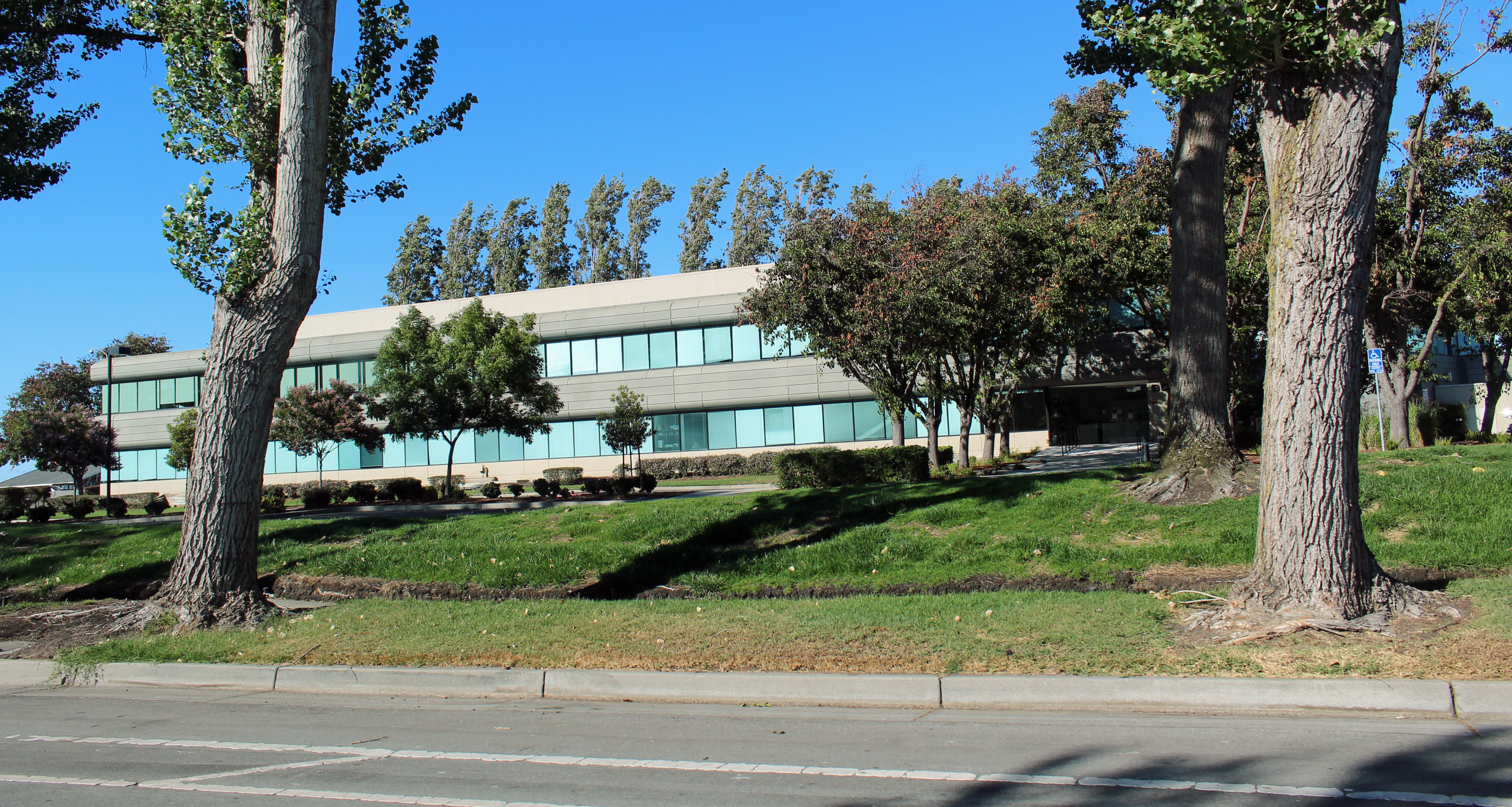
- Headquarters in Redwood City, pictured in July 2022
- Type: Private
- Industry: Technology
- Founded: 1985; 41 years ago
- Founder: Steve Jobs
- Defunct: 1997; 29 years ago
- Fate: Acquired by Apple
- Headquarters: Redwood City, California, U.S.
- Key people: Steve Jobs (chairman, CEO); Ross Perot (director); John Patrick Crecine (director); Avie Tevanian (VP, engineering); Bud Tribble (VP, software development)
- Products: List: NeXT Computer; NeXTcube; NeXTstation; NeXTdimension; NeXTSTEP; NeXTMail; NeXT RISC Workstation; NeXT Laser Printer; NeXT MegaPixel Display; NeXT Music Kit; NeXTcube Turbo; NeXT port; OpenStep; WebObjects
- Number of employees: 530 (1993)
- Website: next.com at the Wayback Machine (archived 1997-04-12)

NeXT, Inc. (later NeXT Computer, Inc. and NeXT Software, Inc.) was an American technology company headquartered in Redwood City, California. It was founded in 1985 by Steve Jobs, the Apple Computer co-founder who had been ousted from Apple earlier that year. The company initially developed workstation computers for higher education and business markets before shifting its focus to software.

NeXT introduced the NeXT Computer in 1988, followed by the NeXTcube and NeXTstation in 1990. Although its computers achieved limited commercial success, the company's NeXTSTEP operating system and its object-oriented software development environment and graphical user interface proved highly influential. NeXT later partnered with Sun Microsystems to create the OpenStep specification, which decoupled the NeXTSTEP operating system's application layer to host it on third-party operating systems. In 1993, NeXT withdrew from the hardware industry to concentrate on marketing OPENSTEP for Mach, its own OpenStep implementation, to other computer vendors. The company also developed WebObjects, one of the first enterprise web frameworks, and a prominent early example of dynamic web pages rather than static content.

In 1997, Apple acquired NeXT for $427 million. The deal returned Jobs to Apple as an advisor, and he would eventually be appointed as the company's CEO. Apple used NeXT's software technologies as the foundation for Rhapsody, Mac OS X (later macOS), and the operating systems that followed.

The company’s workstations and software served as the development platform for the first web server (CERN httpd), the first web browser (WorldWideWeb), and the video games Doom and Quake.

== History ==
=== Background ===
In 1985, Apple co-founder and CEO Steve Jobs led a division campaign called SuperMicro, which was responsible for developing the Macintosh and Lisa computers. They were commercial successes on university campuses because Jobs had personally visited a few notable universities to promote his products, and because of Apple University Consortium, a discounted academic marketing program. The Consortium had earned over $50 million from computer sales by February 1984.

Jobs met Paul Berg, a Nobel Laureate in chemistry, at a luncheon in Silicon Valley held to honor President of France François Mitterrand. Berg was frustrated by the time and expense of researching recombinant DNA via wet laboratories, and suggested that Jobs should use his influence to create a "3M computer" that is designed for higher education.

Jobs was intrigued by Berg's concept of a workstation and contemplated starting a higher-education computer company in late 1985, amid increasing turmoil at Apple. Jobs's division did not release the upgraded versions of the Macintosh computer and much of the Macintosh Office software. As a result, its sales plummeted, and Apple was forced to write off millions of dollars in unsold inventory.

In 1985, John Sculley ousted Jobs from his executive role at Apple and replaced him with Jean-Louis Gassée. Later that year, Jobs began a power struggle to regain control over his company. The board of directors sided with Sculley, and Jobs took a business trip to Western Europe and the Soviet Union on behalf of Apple. In September 1985, after several months of being sidelined, Jobs resigned from Apple. He told the board he was leaving to set up a new computer company, and that he would be taking several Apple employees from the SuperMicro division with him, but he also promised that his new company would not compete with Apple and might even consider licensing their designs to them under the Macintosh brand.

=== Original NeXT team ===
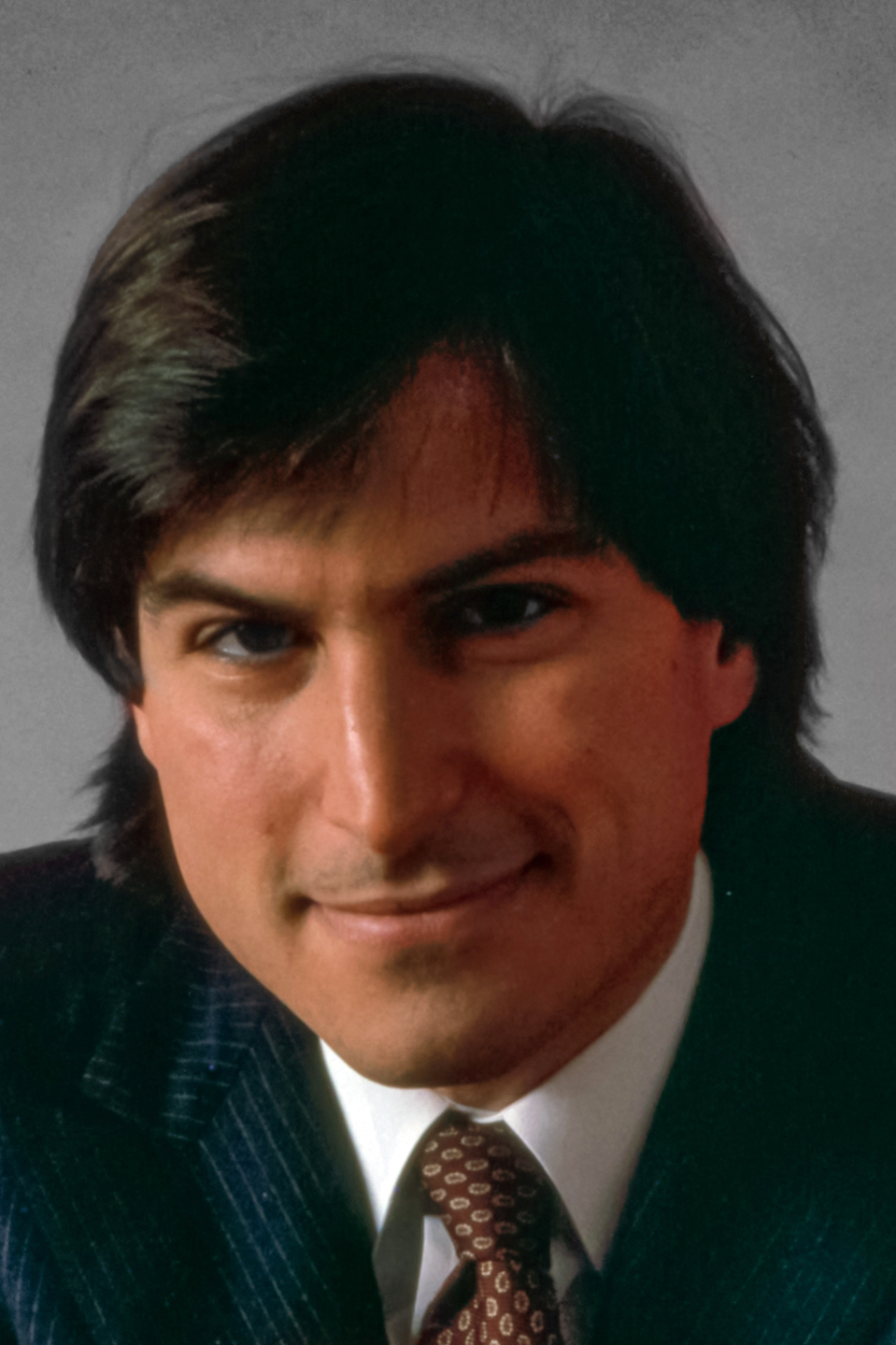
Steve Jobs, here pictured in 1984, founded NeXT in 1985.

NeXT was founded by Steve Jobs and several former Apple employees, including Joanna Hoffman, Bud Tribble, George Crow, Rich Page, Susan Barnes, Susan Kare, and Dan'l Lewin. After consulting with major educational buyers from around the country, including a follow-up meeting with Paul Berg, a tentative specification for a workstation computer was drawn up. It was designed to be powerful enough to run wet lab simulations and affordable enough for dormitory rooms. Before the specifications were finished, however, Apple sued NeXT on September 23, 1985, for "nefarious schemes" to take advantage of the cofounders' insider information. Jobs argued, "It is hard to think that a $2 billion company with 4,300-plus people couldn't compete with six people in blue jeans." The suit was eventually dismissed before trial.

In 1986, Jobs recruited graphic designer Paul Rand to create a brand identity for $100,000 (equivalent to $294,000 in 2025). Jobs recalled, "I asked him if he would come up with a few options, and he said, 'No, I will solve your problem for you and you will pay me. You don't have to use the solution. If you want options go talk to other people.'" Rand created a 20-page brochure detailing the brand, including the precise angle used for the logo (28°) and a new company name spelling, NeXT.

It is believed that Jobs's old friend Tom Suiter came up with the name Next after attending a speech in Seattle by Bill Gates where he repeatedly used the word 'next', when describing new technologies being developed by Microsoft. It seems that neither Jobs nor Gates were aware of the true inspiration for the name, but ironic considering the complex relationship between the two people and their companies.

=== 1987–1993: NeXT Computer ===
==== First generation ====
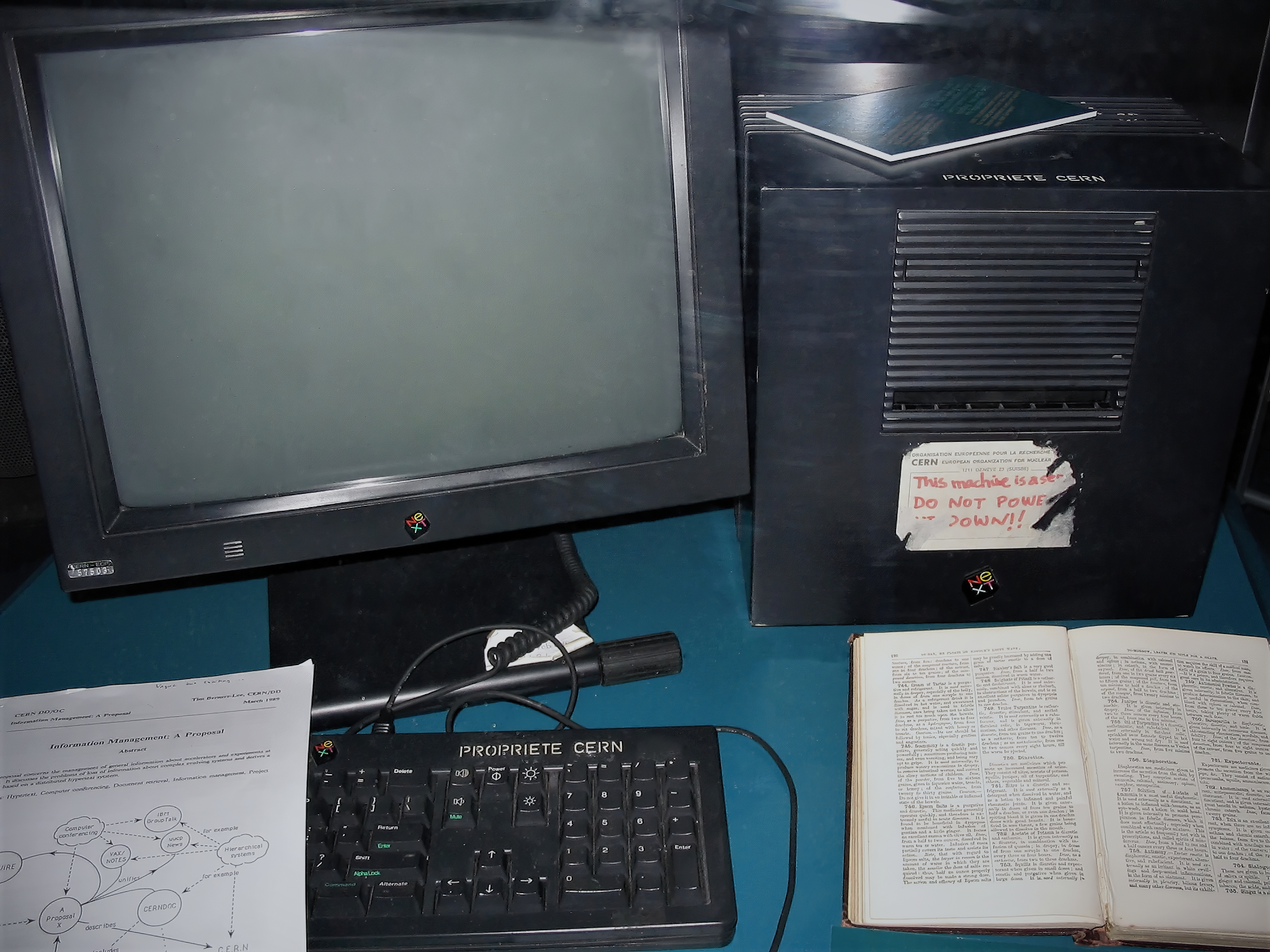
This NeXT Computer was used by computer scientist Sir Tim Berners-Lee at the European Organization for Nuclear Research (CERN) to create the world's first web server and the first web browser and editor.

In mid-1986, NeXT changed its business plan to develop both hardware and software, rather than just workstations. Rich Page, a NeXT cofounder who formerly directed Apple's Lisa team, led a team to develop the hardware, while kernel engineer Avie Tevanian led the development of NeXT's operating system, NeXTSTEP. NeXT's first factory was established in Fremont, California, in 1987; it was capable of manufacturing about 150,000 machines per year. NeXT's first workstation is the NeXT Computer, model N1000, nicknamed "the cube" due to its distinctive magnesium one-foot (30 cm) cubic case. The case was designed by Hartmut Esslinger and his team at Frog Design.

In 1987, Ross Perot became NeXT's first major outside investor. He invested $20 million for 16% of NeXT's stock after seeing a segment about NeXT on the 1986 PBS documentary Entrepreneurs. In 1988, he joined the company's board of directors.

NeXT and Adobe collaborated on Display PostScript (DPS), a 2D graphics engine that was released in 1987. NeXT engineers wrote an alternative windowing engine edition to take full advantage of NeXTSTEP. NeXT engineers used DPS for on-screen graphics such as title bar and scroller for the user-space windowing library.

The original design team anticipated completing the computer in early 1987 and launching it for $3,000 (equivalent to $8,500 in 2025) by mid-year. On October 12, 1988, the NeXT Computer received standing ovations when it was revealed at a private gala event, "NeXT Introduction" in San Francisco, California. The following day, selected educators and software engineers were invited to attend the first public technical overview of the NeXT computer at the event "The NeXT Day" held at the San Francisco Hilton. The event gave developers interested in NeXT software an insight into their architecture, object-oriented programming, and the NeXT Computer. The luncheon speaker was Steve Jobs.

I want some kid at Stanford to be able to cure cancer in his dorm room.

— Steve Jobs, on the purpose of the NeXT Computer

The first NeXT Computers were test launched in 1989, and then NeXT sold a limited number to universities with NeXTSTEP 0.9 beta pre-installed. Initially, this targeted the United States higher-education institutions only, with a base price of $6,500 (equivalent to $17,000 in 2025). The computer was widely reviewed in magazines, primarily the hardware portion. When asked if he was upset that the computer's debut was delayed by several months, Jobs responded, "Late? This computer is five years ahead of its time!"

The NeXT Computer uses a 25 MHz Motorola 68030 central processing unit (CPU). The Motorola 88000 RISC chip was originally considered, but it was not available in sufficient quantities. The computer has between 8 and 64 MB of random-access memory (RAM), a 256 MB magneto-optical (MO) drive, a 40 MB (swap-only), 330 MB, or 660 MB hard disk drive, 10BASE2 Ethernet, NuBus, and a 17-inch MegaPixel grayscale display with 1120×832 pixels. In 1989, a typical new PC, Macintosh, or Amiga computer included a few megabytes of RAM, a 640×480 16-color or 320x240 4,096-color display, a 10- to 20-megabyte hard drive, and few networking capabilities. It is the first computer to ship with a general-purpose DSP chip (Motorola 56001) on the motherboard. This supports sophisticated music and sound processing, including the Music Kit software.

The magneto-optical (MO) drive manufactured by Canon Inc. is the primary mass storage device. This drive technology was relatively new to the market, and the NeXT is the first computer to use it. MO drives were cheaper but much slower than hard drives, with an average seek time of 96 ms; Jobs negotiated Canon's initial price of $150 per blank MO disk so that they could sell at retail for only $50. The drive's design made it impossible to move files between computers without a network, because each NeXT Computer has only one MO drive and the disk can not be removed without shutting down the system. The drive's limited speed and capacity makes it insufficient as NeXTSTEP's primary medium.

In 1989, NeXT started a deal for Businessland, a former Compaq reseller, to sell the NeXT Computer in international markets. Selling through a retailer was a major change from NeXT's original business model of only selling directly to students and educational institutions. Businessland founder David Norman predicted that sales of the NeXT Computer would surpass sales of Compaq computers after 12 months.

That year, Canon invested $100 million in NeXT, for a 16.67% stake, making NeXT worth almost $600 million. This had the condition of installing NeXTSTEP on its own workstations, greatly expanding NeXTSTEP's market. After NeXT exited the hardware business, Canon produced a PC line called object.station—including models 31, 41, 50, and 52—specifically designed to run NeXTSTEP on Intel. Canon was NeXT's distributor in Japan.

The NeXT Computer was released in 1990 for $9,999 (equivalent to $25,000 in 2025). In June 1991, Perot resigned from the board of directors to concentrate on his company, Perot Systems, a Plano, Texas–based software system integrator.

==== Second generation ====
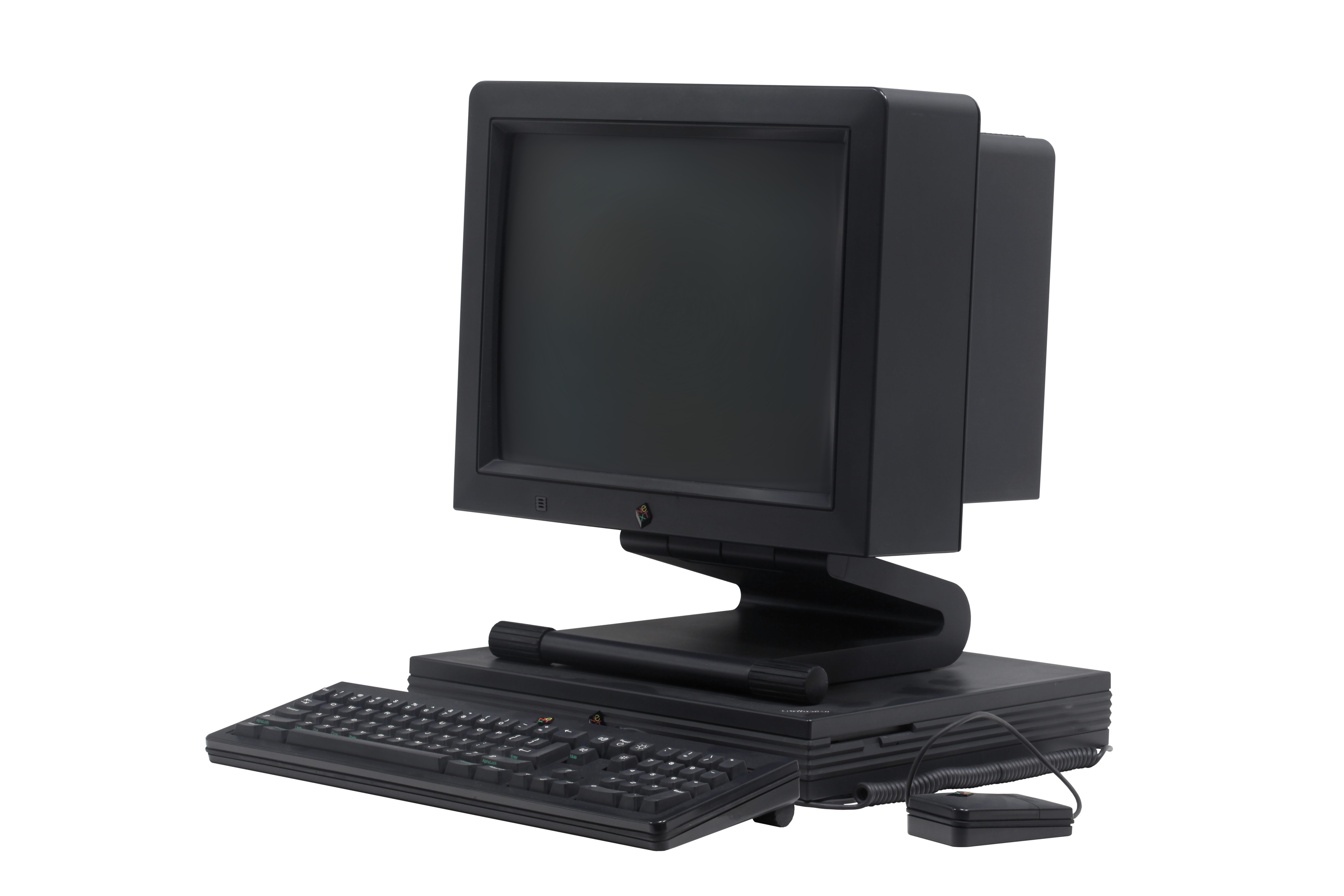
NeXTstation with matching monitor

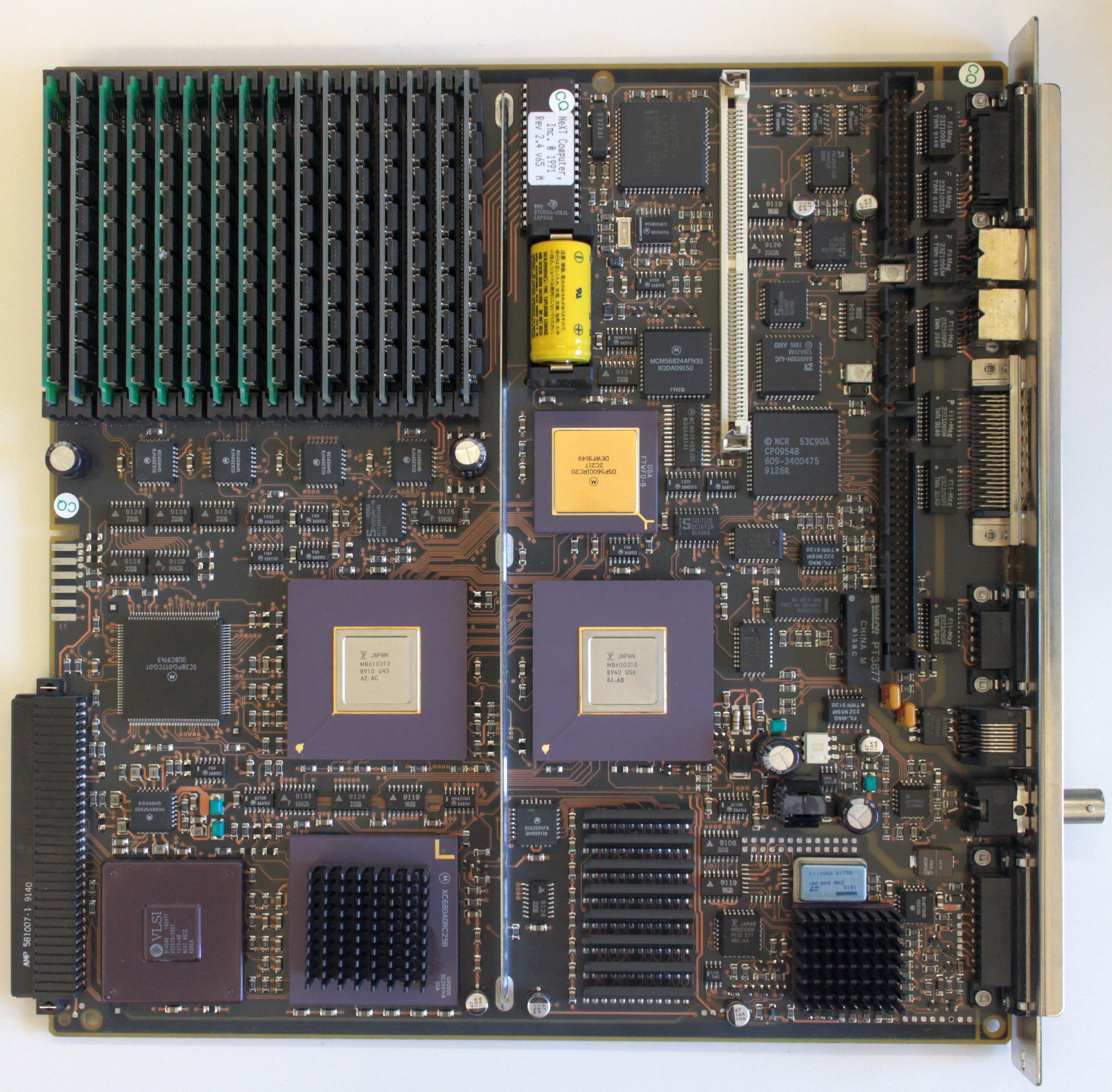
The mainboard of the NeXTcube (1990) has a Motorola 68040 at the lower edge. To the right are the interfaces, to the left the system bus. The enlarged view of the image has annotations for most of the components.

In 1990, NeXT released a second generation of workstations, a revised NeXT Computer called NeXTcube and the NeXTstation (model N1100). The NeXTstation's nickname is "the slab" for its low-rise box form-factor. Jobs ensured that NeXT staffers did not nickname the NeXTstation "pizza box" to avoid inadvertent comparison with competitor Sun workstations, which already had that nickname.

The machines were initially planned to use the 2.88 MB floppy drive, but its floppy disks were expensive and had failed to supplant the 1.44 MB floppy. NeXT used the CD-ROM drive instead, which eventually became the industry standard for storage. Color graphics were available on the NeXTstation Color (model N1200) and NeXTdimension graphics processor hardware for the NeXTcube. The new computers, with the new Motorola 68040 processor, were cheaper and faster than their predecessors.

In 1992, NeXT launched "Turbo" variants of the NeXTcube and NeXTstation, with a 33 MHz 68040 processor and the maximum RAM capacity increased to 128 MB. In 1992, NeXT sold 20,000 computers, counting upgraded motherboards on back order as system sales. The company reported sales of $140 million for the year, which encouraged Canon to invest a further $30 million to keep the company afloat.

In its existence, Next has sold a total of 50,000 copies of Nextstep, says Jobs. It's not much of an installed base, so he predicts the company will ship 50,000 Nextstep packages in 1993. But Next needs to increase its volume three-fold in order to build enough momentum to forestall Microsoft and Taligent in the object-oriented software business.

— UnixWorld, April 1993

In total, 50,000 NeXT machines were sold, including 20,000 units that were purchased and modified by the CIA, which were subsequently sent to the then top-secret National Reconnaissance Office located in Chantilly, Virginia. According to The Wall Street Journal, analysts at the NRO "used NeXT's high-resolution screens and specialized chips to scan satellite imagery" in order to "detect whether a country had moved its military ... or [to determine] if it was building a missile silo."

NeXT's long-term plan was to migrate to one of the emerging high-performance Reduced Instruction Set Computing (RISC) architectures, with the NeXT RISC Workstation (NRW). Initially, the NRW was to be based on the Motorola 88110 processor, but it was later redesigned around dual PowerPC 601s, due to a lack of confidence in Motorola's commitment to the 88000-series architecture in the time leading up to the AIM alliance's transition to PowerPC.

=== 1993–1996: NeXT Software, Inc. ===
The NeXTSTEP operating system interface

In late 1991, in preparation for NeXT's future withdrawal from the hardware industry, the company started porting the NeXTSTEP operating system to Intel 80486-based IBM PC compatible computers. In January 1992, it was demonstrated at NeXTWorld Expo. By mid-1993, the process was completed, and version 3.1 (NeXTSTEP 486) was released.

NeXTSTEP 3.x was later ported to PA-RISC- and SPARC-based platforms, for a total of four versions: NeXTSTEP/NeXT (for NeXT's own hardware), NeXTSTEP/Intel, NeXTSTEP/PA-RISC, and NeXTSTEP/SPARC. Although the latter three ports were not widely used, NeXTSTEP gained popularity at institutions such as First Chicago NBD, Swiss Bank Corporation, O'Connor and Company, due to its sophisticated programming model. The software was used by many U.S. government agencies, including the United States Naval Research Laboratory, the National Security Agency, the Advanced Research Projects Agency, the Central Intelligence Agency, and the National Reconnaissance Office. Some IBM PC clone vendors offered somewhat customized hardware solutions that were delivered running NeXTSTEP on Intel, such as the Elonex NextStation and the Canon object.station 41.

In 1993, NeXT withdrew from the hardware industry, and the company was renamed to NeXT Software, Inc. Consequently, 230 of the 530 staff employees were laid off. NeXT negotiated to sell its hardware business, including the Fremont factory, to Canon, which later canceled the deal. Work on the PowerPC machines was stopped, along with all hardware production. Sun CEO Scott McNealy announced plans to invest $10 million in 1993 and use NeXT software in future Sun systems. NeXT partnered with Sun to create a programming environment called OpenStep, which is NeXTSTEP's application layer decoupled for third party operating systems. In 1994, Microsoft and NeXT collaborated on a port of OpenStep to Windows NT, which was never released.

In January 1994, a developers' conference was held in Washington, D.C. Attendees of the 1994 NeXT East Coast Developer Conference had the opportunity to purchase a software bundle including NEXTSTEP 3.2.

Stepstone, originally named Productivity Products International (PPI), was a software company founded in 1983 by Brad Cox and Tom Love, best known for releasing the original version of the Objective-C programming language. In April 1995, NeXT acquired the Objective-C trademark and rights from Stepstone. Stepstone concurrently licensed back from NeXT the right to continue selling its Objective-C based products.

After exiting the hardware business, NeXT focused on other operating systems. New OpenStep products were released, including OpenStep Enterprise for Windows NT. NeXT launched WebObjects, a platform for building dynamic web applications. It did not achieve wide popularity, partly because of the initial high price of $50,000 (equivalent to $105,600 in 2025), but it did generate profit for the company. WebObjects is the first and most prominent early example of a web application server that enabled dynamic page generation based on user interactions instead of static web content. WebObjects was used by large businesses including Dell, Disney, Deutsche Bank, the BBC, Ford, and Nissan. After Apple's acquisition of NeXT, WebObjects was used for the iTunes Store and online Apple Store.

=== 1996–1997: Acquisition by Apple ===
On December 20, 1996, Apple Computer announced its intention to acquire NeXT. Apple paid $427 million in cash, shares, stock options, and debt. Steve Jobs preferred to only receive cash, but Gil Amelio insisted that Steve Jobs take 1.5 million Apple shares to give the deal credibility. The main purpose of the acquisition was to use NeXTSTEP as a foundation to replace the dated classic Mac OS. Steve Jobs also returned to Apple as a consultant.

We went for one of our, you know, signature Steve Jobs walks around Palo Alto, and ... we happened to see someone who was in that meeting from the [Apple] management team who said, 'You guys won easily, no problem. You have nothing to worry about.'

— Avie Tevanian, presenting NeXT versus Be to Apple

The deal was finalized on February 7, 1997. Jobs, quickly became frustrated with Amelio and the board, and in June 1997 anonymously sold off his 1.5 million shares. This massive sell-off caused the stock to drop to a 12-year low, rattling the board of directors, leading to Amelio's ouster in July 1997. Jobs became the Apple's de facto chief. He was formally named interim chief executive on September 16.

Meanwhile, Apple started porting the OPENSTEP for Mach operating system to the PowerPC architecture of Macintosh. The first release of the new operating system was codenamed Rhapsody, with the OPENSTEP-derived API being named "Yellow Box". For backward compatibility, Apple added the "Blue Box" subsystem to Rhapsody, running existing classic Mac OS applications in a self-contained cooperative multitasking environment. At the same time, an Intel port and OpenStep Enterprise toolkit for Windows were produced.

In 2000, Jobs took the CEO position as a permanent assignment, holding the position until his resignation on August 24, 2011, shortly before his death on October 5, 2011.

A server version of Rhapsody was released as Mac OS X Server 1.0 in 1999, and the first consumer version, Mac OS X 10.0, in 2001. The Yellow Box API was renamed Cocoa and Blue Box was renamed Classic Environment and changed to run applications full-screen without requiring a separate window. Apple included an updated version of the original Macintosh toolbox, called Carbon, allowing applications using it to run natively on the classic Mac OS and on Mac OS X without the constraints of Blue Box. Some of NeXTSTEP's interface features are used in Mac OS X, including the Dock, the Services menu, the Finder's "Column" view, and the Cocoa text system.

NeXTSTEP's processor-independent capabilities were retained in Mac OS X, leading eventually to PowerPC, x86, and ARM versions. Only PowerPC versions were publicly available before 2006; Apple transitioned its Mac computers to Intel processors by August 2006, and discontinued the PowerPC versions of Mac OS X by 2009. An ARM version followed in 2020, and Apple transitioned to ARM processors as of September 2022.

== Corporate culture and community ==
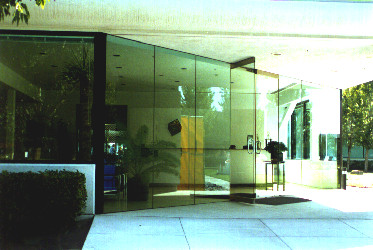
Entrance to NeXT's Redwood City office in 1995

Steve Jobs created a unique corporate culture at NeXT in terms of facilities, salaries, and benefits. Jobs had experimented with some structural changes at Apple, but at NeXT he abandoned conventional corporate structures, instead making a "community" with "members" instead of employees. There were only two different salaries at NeXT until the early 1990s. Team members who joined before 1986 were paid $75,000 (equivalent to $220,000 in 2025) and those who joined afterward were paid $50,000 (equivalent to $147,000 in 2025). This caused a few awkward situations where managers were paid less than their employees. Later, employees were given performance reviews and raises every six months. To foster openness, all employees had full access to the payrolls, although few employees ever used the privilege. NeXT's health insurance plan offered benefits to not only married couples but unmarried and same-sex couples, although the latter privilege was later withdrawn due to insurance complications. The payroll schedule was also very different from other Silicon Valley companies at the time, because instead of employees being paid twice per month at the end of the pay period, they were paid once per month in advance.

Jobs found office space in the Stanford Research Park in Palo Alto, California, at 3475 Deer Creek Road, occupying a glass-and-concrete building that featured a staircase designed by the architect I. M. Pei. The interior was gutted and elegantly redone with an open floor featuring hardwood flooring, custom furniture and Ansel Adams prints. The only enclosed rooms were Jobs's office and a few conference rooms.

To avoid inventory errors, NeXT used the just-in-time (JIT) inventory strategy. The company contracted out for all major components, such as mainboards and cases, and had the finished components shipped to the first floor of the Palo Alto office where they were assembled.

NeXT's expansion prompted the company to move to 800 and 900 Chesapeake Drive, in Redwood City, also designed by Pei. The architectural centerpiece was a "floating" staircase with no visible supports.

NeXT's Palo Alto office was subsequently occupied by Internet Shopping Network (a subsidiary of Home Shopping Network) in 1994, and later by SAP AG. Its Redwood City office was later occupied by Openwave Systems, ApniCure, and OncoMed Pharmaceuticals Inc.

The first issue of NeXTWORLD magazine was printed in 1991. It was edited by Michael Miley and, later, Dan Ruby and was published in San Francisco by Integrated Media. It was the only mainstream periodical to discuss NeXT computers and software. The publication was discontinued in 1994 after only four volumes. A developer conference, NeXTWORLD Expo, was held in 1991 and 1992 at the San Francisco Civic Center and in 1993 and 1994 at the Moscone Center in San Francisco, with Jobs as the keynote speaker.

== Legacy ==
Though not very profitable, the company had a wide-ranging impact on the computer industry. Object-oriented programming and graphical user interfaces became more common after the 1988 release of the NeXT Computer and NeXTSTEP. The platform was often held as the trendsetter when other companies started to emulate the success of NeXT's object-oriented system.

Widely seen as a response to NeXT, Microsoft announced the Cairo project in 1991; the Cairo specification included similar object-oriented user-interface features for a proposed consumer version of Windows NT. Although Cairo was ultimately abandoned, some elements were integrated into other projects.

By 1993, Taligent was considered by the press to be a competitor in objects and operating systems, even without any product release, and with NeXT as a main point of comparison. For the first few years, Taligent's theoretical innovation was often compared to NeXT's older but mature and commercially established platform, (Note: Attributed to multiple references:) but Taligent's launch in 1995 was called "too little, too late", especially when compared with NeXT.

Several developers used the NeXT platform to write pioneering programs. For example, in 1990, computer scientist Tim Berners-Lee used a NeXT Computer to develop the world's first web server (CERN httpd) and the first web browser and editor (WorldWideWeb). The video game series Doom and Quake were developed by id Software using NeXT computers. Other commercial programs were released for NeXT computers, including Altsys Virtuoso—a vector-drawing program with page-layout features, which was ported to Mac OS and Windows as Aldus FreeHand v4—and the Lotus Improv spreadsheet program. (Note: Attributed to multiple references:)

The open-source GNUstep widget toolkit, window manager and desktop can be considered as open-source implementations of NeXTSTEP's object model and user interface.

== See also ==
- NeXT character set
- Multi-architecture binary

== Bibliography ==
- Malone, Michael (1999). Infinite Loop. Currency. ISBN 0-385-48684-7.
- Young, Jeffrey S.; Simon, William L. (2005). iCon: Steve Jobs. John Wiley & Sons. ISBN 0-471-72083-6.
- Panzarino, Matthew (November 20, 2011). "Steve Jobs brainstorms with the NeXT team". TNW. Archived from the original on April 16, 2021.
