= Macintosh XL =

Modified version of the Apple Lisa

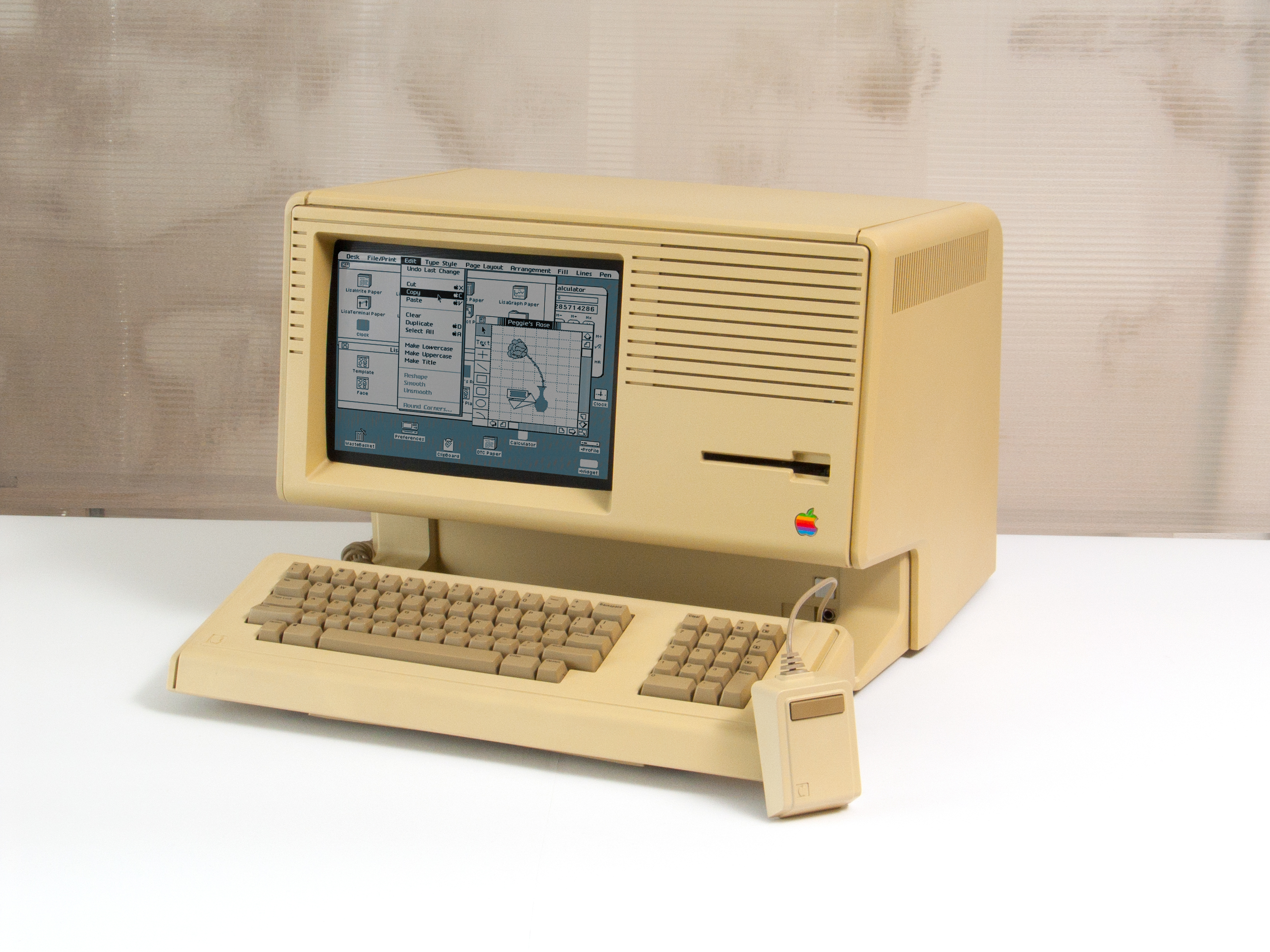
- Manufacturer: Apple Computer
- Released: January 1, 1985; 41 years ago
- Introductory price: US$3,995 (equivalent to $11,960 in 2025)
- Discontinued: April 29, 1985
- Operating system: MacWorks XL: System 1.1 – 3.2; MacWorks Plus: System 1.1 – 6.0.3; MacWorks Plus II: System 1.1 – 7.5.5
- CPU: Motorola 68000 @ 5 MHz
- Memory: 512 KB RAM, expandable to 2 MB
- Predecessor: Apple Lisa 2
- Related: Macintosh 128; Macintosh 512K

The Macintosh XL is a modified version of the Apple Lisa personal computer made by Apple Computer. It shipped with MacWorks XL, a Lisa program that emulated the 64 K Macintosh ROM. An identical machine was previously sold as the Lisa 2/10 running only the Lisa OS.

== Hardware ==
The Macintosh XL has a 400K 3.5" floppy drive and an internal 10 MB proprietary "Widget" hard drive, with support for an optional 5 or 10 MB external ProFile hard drive through an optional parallel interface card. The machine uses a Motorola 68000 CPU clocked at 5 MHz, together with 512 KB RAM. The Macintosh XL was discontinued in April 1985.

=== Upgrades ===
Unlike all other Macintosh computers, the stock Macintosh XL used rectangular pixels, a consequence of its origins as a Lisa. The resolution of its 12-inch (30.5 cm) display was 720 × 364 pixels. Square pixels were available through the Macintosh XL Screen Kit upgrade, which changed the resolution to 608 × 432 pixels. The CPU could be replaced with a new CPU board containing up to 8 MB RAM, called the XLerator 18. The maximum upgraded RAM with conventional add-in RAM cards was 2 MB, four times the maximum capacity of earlier Macintosh computers. With modifications to the CPU board, the XL could accommodate up to 4 MB of RAM.

=== MacWorks improvements ===
The computer originally shipped with MacWorks XL, a Lisa program that emulated the 64 K Macintosh ROM.

MacWorks Plus was developed by Sun Remarketing as a successor to MacWorks XL, providing application compatibility with the Macintosh Plus. MacWorks Plus added support for an 800 KB 3.5" floppy disk and System software up through version 6.0.3. MacWorks Plus II extended that to the same System 7.5.5 limit imposed on all 68000 processors.

== History ==
Apple Computer announced the Macintosh XL at its January 1985 annual meeting as part of Macintosh Office. After poor sales of the Apple Lisa, Apple redesigned some of the hardware and rebranded the machine as the Macintosh XL. Based on Lisa's prior sales figures, Apple ordered a limited number of parts intended to last through 1985. Demand for the Macintosh XL exceeded Apple's expectations, exhausting its parts allocation earlier than anticipated.

=== Discontinuation ===
Apple discontinued the Macintosh XL less than four months after its introduction. Apple sold its entire allocation of parts earlier than planned, and continuing production at the volume needed to meet demand would have resulted in a loss on each unit sold. The cancellation also reflected a broader consolidation of expenses and projects.

One developer told Computerworld that the Macintosh XL existed only so Apple could claim a Macintosh with a hard drive and additional memory was available, and said most developers were unsurprised by the cancellation given Apple's evident preference for the Macintosh over the Lisa. In 1986, Apple offered an exchange program for owners of the Lisa and Macintosh XL: customers could trade in their machines along with $1,495 for a new Macintosh Plus and Hard Disk 20, which had a combined list price of $4,098.

=== Sun Remarketing ===
After Apple removed the XL from its price list in September 1985, Sun Remarketing of Logan, Utah purchased a portion of Apple's remaining inventory and continued to sell the machines under license with an updated version of MacWorks Plus, rebranding the product as the Macintosh Professional.

Development of MacWorks Plus continued after Apple ceased Lisa sales, extending software support for the installed base of Lisa and Macintosh XL machines through System 7.5.5.

=== Legacy ===
The stronger-than-expected demand for the Macintosh XL has been cited as evidence that the Macintosh line required a more professional configuration — one supporting larger monitors, greater memory, and more expandability than the Macintosh 512K offered.

== Timeline ==
Timeline of Compact Macintosh models
See also: List of Mac models and Compact Macintosh

== See also ==
- Macintosh 128K
- Macintosh 512K
- Macintosh Plus
