= AUC =

AUC may refer to:

- Ab urbe condita or Anno urbis conditae, Latin for "from the founding of the city" (of Rome), used for dates
- African Union Commission, the executive/administrative branch or secretariat of the supranational organisation
- Ammonium uranyl carbonate, a chemical compound used in uranium processing
- Appropriate use criteria for a medical procedure or service
- Archimedean Upper Conservatory, a highly ranked charter high school in Miami, Florida
- Area under the curve (receiver operating characteristic), a performance measure for binary classifiers
- Area under the curve (pharmacokinetics), regarding plasma drug concentration-time curves
- Authentication Center in a GSM mobile phone network
- United Self-Defense Forces of Colombia (Spanish: Autodefensas Unidas de Colombia), former Colombian paramilitary and drugs group
- Santiago Pérez Quiroz Airport, Arauca, Colombia, IATA code
- Analytical ultracentrifugation, Physical and biophysical chemistry instrument
- a codon for the amino acid isoleucine

== Colleges and universities ==
- Aalborg University, formerly Aalborg University Center
- Alliance University College, merged into Ambrose University College, Calgary, Alberta, Canada
- Amsterdam University College, a liberal arts and sciences college in Amsterdam, Netherlands
- The American University in Cairo, Egypt
- American University of the Caribbean a medical school in Sint Maarten
- Apple University Consortium in Australia
- Atlanta University Center, the University Center Consortium in Atlanta, Georgia
- Atlantic Union College, a liberal arts college in South Lancaster, Massachusetts, US
