= Radiodrum =

Musical instrument

Radio-Baton demonstration by Mathews on SF MusicTech Summit 2010

The Radiodrum or radio-baton is a musical instrument played in three-dimensional space using two mallets (snare drum sticks with wires). It was developed at Bell Labs in the 1980s (and patented), originally to be a three-dimensional computer mouse. Currently it is used as a musical instrument similar to a MIDI controller in the sense that it has no inherent sound or effect, but rather produces control signals that can be used to control sound-production (or other effect.) As such, it can be thought of as a general telepresence input device. The radiodrum works in a similar way to the theremin, which uses magnetic capacitance to locate the position of the drumsticks. The two mallets act as antennas transmitting on slightly different frequencies and the drum surface acts as a set of antennas. The combination of the antenna signals is used to derive X, Y and Z.

The radiodrum was designed by Bob Boie. Max Mathews recognized its musical potential, mainly focusing on a conducting paradigm, and developed several other versions of it. Andrew Schloss pioneered its use as a percussion device and further developed its software and hardware. The radiodrum has been used to control visual effects, and even robotic acoustic instruments like the Yamaha Disklavier and Trimpin instruments.

The latest version (as of 2013) of the radiodrum was developed by Bob Boie and Andrew Schloss. In addition to X, Y and Z, there is an output for the derivative of Z, which is used to detect changes of direction of the mallets, enabling fine control over snare-drum rolls and other nuanced percussive techniques.

In addition to works by Andrew Schloss, the instrument has been used extensively by composer David A. Jaffe, with Schloss as soloist, in works including:

- "The Seven Wonders of the Ancient World," a 70-minute seven-movement concerto for radiodrum-controlled Yamaha Disklavier piano and an orchestra of plucked strings and percussion instruments
- "Racing Against Time," for radiodrum-controlled computer physical models (electronic sound), with two violins, two saxophones and piano
- "The Space Between Us," for radiodrum-controlled Trimpin percussion instruments and eight strings distributed around the concert hall
- "Underground Economy," an Afro-Cuban improvisational work for radiodrum-controlled electronics, violin and piano

Other works include Richard Boulanger's "Solemn Song for Evening", using the Bohlen–Pierce scale.

== See also ==
- List of music software
