= Trimpin =

German kinetic sculptor, sound artist, and musician (born 1951)

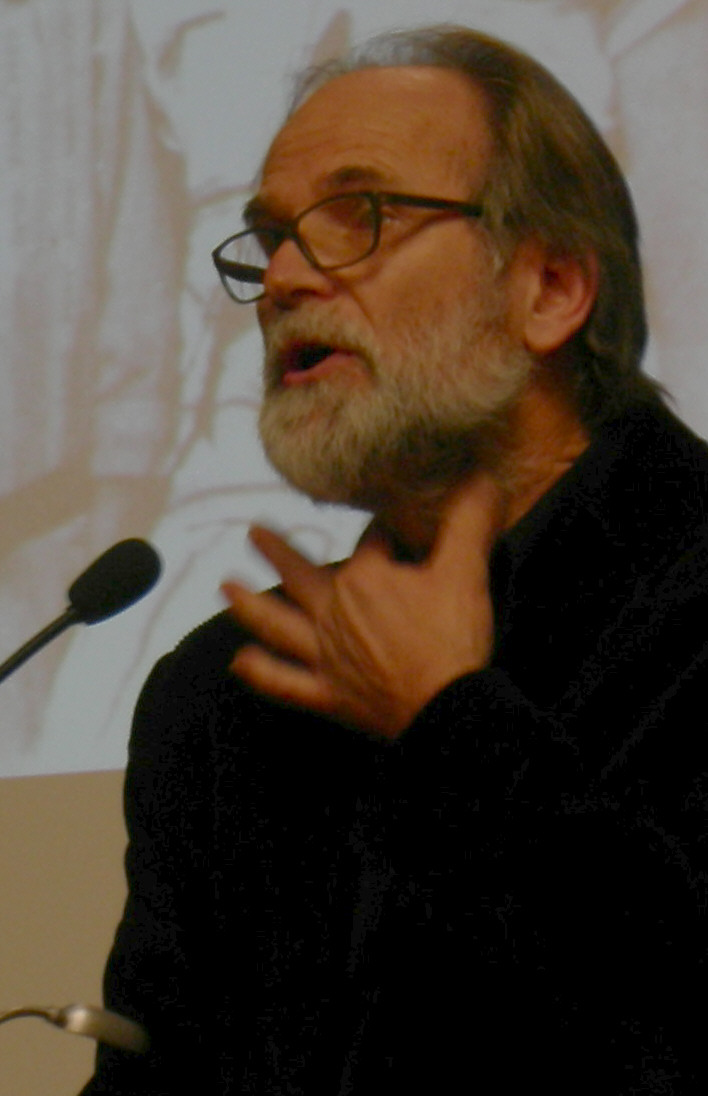
Trimpin receiving the 2007 University of Washington Libraries' Anne Gould Hauberg Artist Images Award.

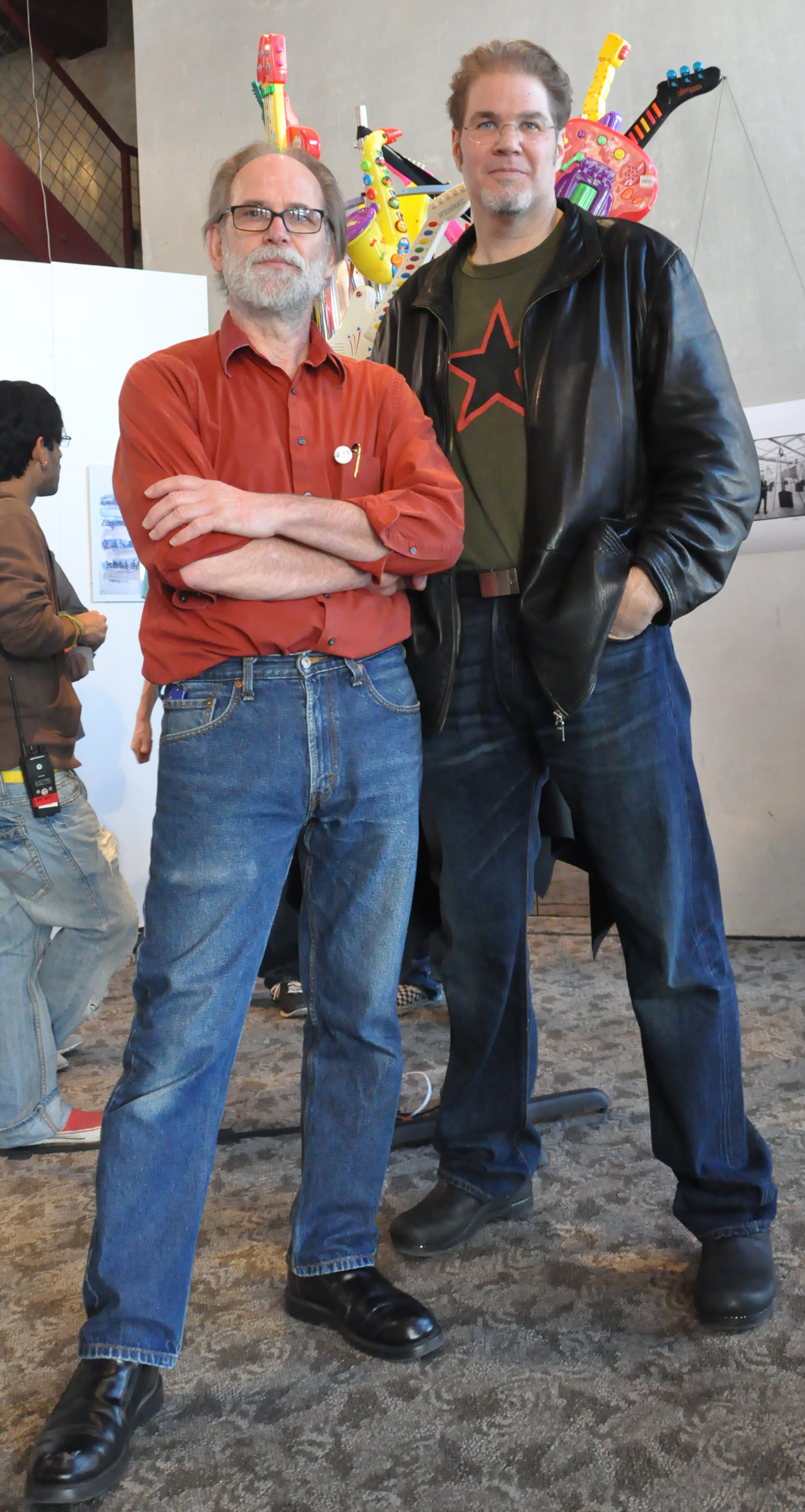
Trimpin with Peter Esmonde in March 2009

Trimpin (born Gerhard Trimpin) (born 1951) is a German born kinetic sculptor, sound artist, and musician currently living in Seattle and Tieton, Washington.

Trimpin's work integrates sculpture and sound across a variety of media including fixed installation and live music, theater, and dance performance. His works are known to be electromechanically actuated by embedded microcontrollers that communicate digitally through MIDI.

== Early life ==
Trimpin grew up in Istein, now part of Efringen-Kirchen, near the French and Swiss borders. He is a native speaker of Alemannisch and the son of a brass and woodwind player. As a child he had access to old brass instruments to experiment with. He played brass instruments himself, but developed an allergy to metal that affected his lips and made him give up playing. Trimpin's father treated him to spatial musical experiences, playing at some distance in the German woods, and young Trimpin experimented with old radios and with cutting apart and recombining elements of musical instruments. He studied at the University of Berlin.

One early project in Berlin used a balancing clown figurine to play a wire recording of speech. The wire was stretched across a room and tilted up and down while the figurine rode the wire and played it, backwards and forwards. The history of his work recapitulates much of the history of data and sound storage technology. Prior to the availability of MIDI, Trimpin developed his own protocol for computer storage of music.

In 1980 Trimpin moved to America because he needed access to old, used technological components, which were difficult to find in Europe; he settled in Seattle because it "sounded like a nice place to live". In the 1980s, he worked one month per year fishing in Alaska to support his work.

== Inventions ==
One of his early installations was a six-story-high microtonal xylophone (that is, one with smaller intervals between achievable tones than in conventional Western musical scales) running through a spiral staircase in an Amsterdam theater, with computer-driven melodies ripping up and down it. Another piece was a water fountain installation in which drops of water, timed in complex rhythmic fugues, dripped into glass receptacles. Several of his pieces since that time have made similar use of falling water. A dance piece used the dancers' bodies to make music, with small bellows in the dancers' shoes that played duck calls, air blowers triggered by sacs under their armpits, etc.

Trimpin has invented a gamelan whose iron bells are suspended in air by electronic magnets; a photo sensor prevents them from rising past a certain point, and since they don't touch anything, once rung they will sound with a phenomenally long decay. Another invention is an extra-long bass clarinet. Extra keys spiraled around the instrument allow a microtonal scale. A human blows through the mouthpiece; the dozens of extra keys are played via computer. In 1987 he met Conlon Nancarrow, composer of experimental player piano music unplayable by a human pianist. Trimpin already had the technology to convert Nancarrow's player piano rolls into MIDI information, thus saving their contents from potential deterioration and disaster.

Trimpin has invented machines to play every instrument of the orchestra via MIDI commands. His mechanical cello can achieve virtually unnoticeable bow changes, and his MIDI timpani can be rubbed quickly by the mallet, for a timpani drone unachievable by human hands. Indeed, his pieces do not generally try to imitate human playing. "What I'm trying to do," he has remarked, "is go beyond human physical limitations to play instruments in such a way that no matter how complex the composition of the timing, it can be pushed over the limits."

Although most of his music is composed digitally, Trimpin almost never uses electronic sounds — not because he objects to them on principle — but because he asserts that loudspeaker design, mostly unchanged for 100 years, has lagged behind the rest of electronic music technology. An outlier to the method audiences normally experience his work, the tornado-shaped column of self-tuning guitars called IF VI WAS IX: Roots and Branches, installed in Seattle's Museum of Popular Culture, uses electric guitars and an array of headphones due to the constraints of the space and neighboring exhibitions.

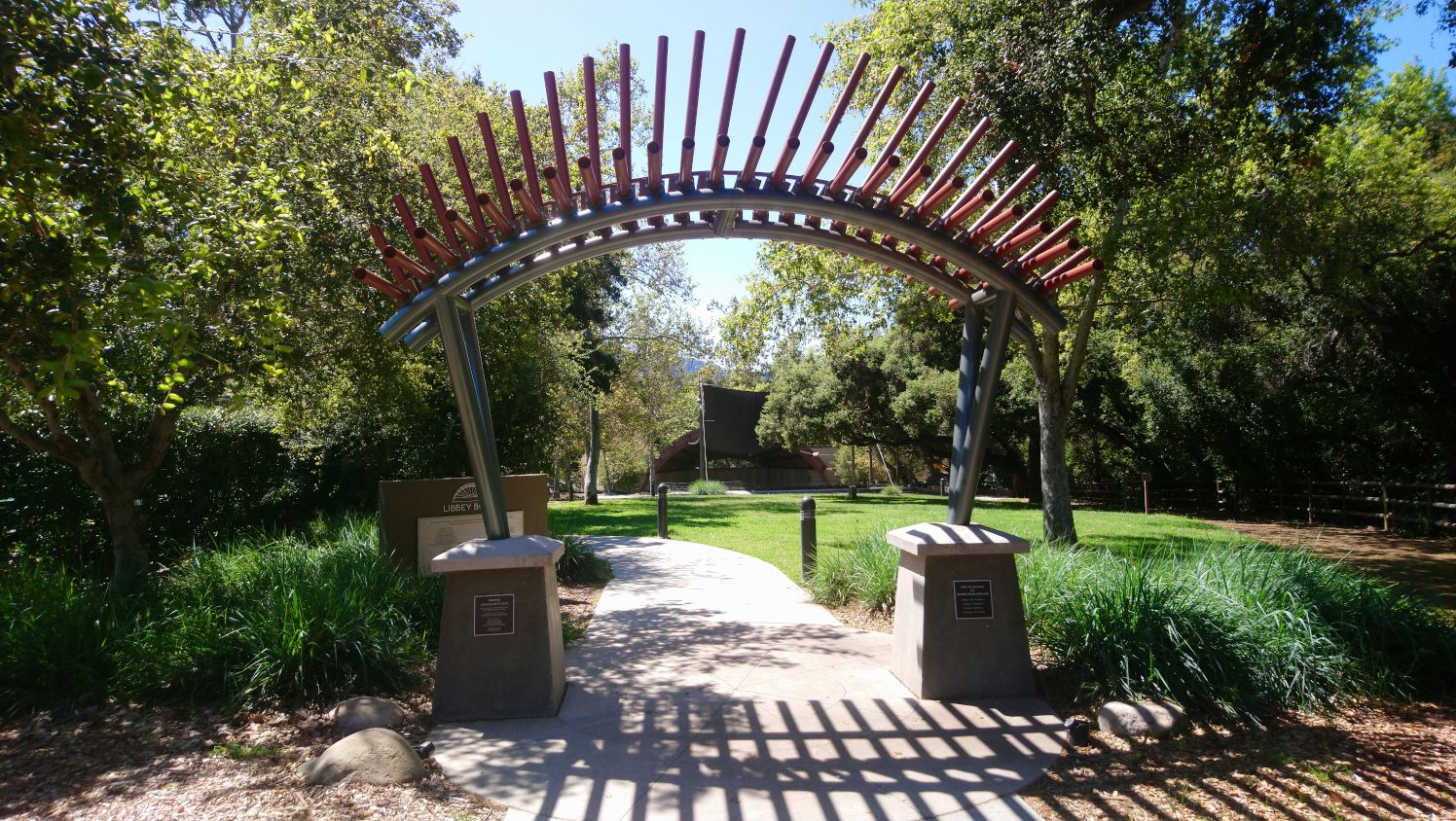
The Sound Arch in Libbey Park

== Exhibited work ==
Beginning in July 2005, several Washington museums engaged in a year-long survey of his work curated by Beth Sellars, with installations and/or performances occurring at the Seattle Art Museum at SAAM, Henry Art Gallery of the University of Washington, Consolidated Works (which dissolved shortly after the Trimpin Exhibit), the Frye Art Museum, Jack Straw New Media Gallery, and Suyama Space in Seattle; the Museum of Glass and the Tacoma Art Museum in Tacoma; the Washington State University Museum of Art (Pullman); and, outside of Washington State, at the Missoula Museum of Art in Missoula, Montana and the Vancouver International Jazz Festival in Vancouver, British Columbia, Canada.

The Seattle-Tacoma International Airport, Concourse A artwalk includes Trimpin's Contraption installed next to the concourse's first moving sidewalk. Contraption is a motion activated work consisting of two moving "contraptions" made of assorted musical instruments and found objects, housed in an 80-foot-long (24 m) glass case. Each "contraption" plays music in response to people passing by.

Trimpin is a recipient of numerous honors. Trimpin received a 1994 Foundation for Contemporary Arts Grants to Artists Award. Trimpin was also the recipient of a 1997 MacArthur "Genius" Award. More recently, he was an invited keynote speaker at the 7th International NIME (New Interfaces for Musical Expression) conference in New York City, in June 2007. In May 2010, he was the honorary recipient of a Doctor of Musical Arts from California Institute of the Arts.

As of 2007, he is among a number of artists establishing studio space in Tieton, Washington, on the edge of Washington's Yakima Valley.

Trimpin's water-based sound sculpture "Sheng High" was exhibited during the 2009 Ojai Music Festival, and one of his creations was featured in one of the pieces performed on the last evening. He was subsequently commissioned to create a permanent sound sculpture (called the Sound Arch) for the music amphitheatre at Ojai.

Trimpin's sculpture, Klompen, is a sound sculpture that includes 96 Dutch wooden clogs that connect to a computer by wires suspended from the ceiling. Placing a quarter in a token box electronically triggers mallets in the toes of the shoes. Klompen plays 20 different compositions. It is part of the permanent collection at Utah State University's Nora Eccles Harrison Museum of Art.

The permanent installation Seismofon is on display at the Science Museum of Minnesota. This giant marimba, xylophone, and percussion instrument transforms earthquakes into music. A computer receives real-time worldwide seismic data from the USGS and generates scales and patterns based on the cultures in the general areas of the seismic events. Seismofon is also known by the name Magnitude in C#, and it was commissioned in 1999.

In 2010, Trimpin transformed into robotic form a set of percussion instruments that David A. Jaffe inherited from Henry Brant for use in Jaffe's composition The Space Between Us. The performance (at the 2011 Other Minds Festival) included an installation with 18 robotic tubular bells hung above the audience, two robotic xylophones, a robotic glockenspiel and a disklavier, all controlled by a percussionist using a 3-D sensor (radiodrum), augmented by two live string quartets surrounding the audience.

Since Fall 2010, Trimpin has been working with students and faculty at Stanford University's Center for Computer Research in Music and Acoustics (CCRMA) to create the multimedia installation "The Gurs Zyklus." Composer/director/performer Rinde Eckert will collaborate with Trimpin on the project.

From March 16 until April 28, 2012, Trimpin's installation "Trimpin:(CanonX+4:33=100) " was open to the public at Open Space in Victoria, BC, Canada. The installation featured five deconstructed pianos with various mechanical actuators configured to play compositions written by Trimpin. The audience was able to activate a composition by manoeuvering an arcade style game joystick which in turn moved an RGB colour sensor suspended on the wall. The sensor was positioned in front of an array of primary colour silk screened posters, also made by Trimpin. After a position was selected, the listener could push a button located next to the joystick, the sensor would scan the colour and utilize the information in a composition choosing algorithm. Almost immediately after the button was pressed a composition would begin. On the final day of the installation, the group MISTIC held a concert with compositions created specifically for the installation. By removing the control computer for the installation, and implementing their own, each member was able to perform live.

Since 2013 the Liquid Percussion (Das Regentropfen Schlagzeug) is exhibited at Swiss Science Center Technorama in Winterthur.

== Documentary ==
A feature documentary film about the artist/inventor/composer's life and work, TRIMPIN: The Sound of Invention, produced and directed by Peter Esmonde, premiered at the South by Southwest Film Festival in Austin, Texas, in March 2009. The documentary subsequently screened at film festivals in New York, London, Toronto, Barcelona, São Paulo, Buenos Aires, Vancouver, Dublin, Goteborg, Oslo, and New Zealand. DVD release is slated for Fall 2010.

== Book ==
In May 2011, a biographical book entitled TRIMPIN / Contraptions for Art and Sound was published by Marquand Books. The book was compiled and edited by Anne Focke with contributions from many of Trimpin's friends and collaborators including Kyle Gann, Charles Amirkhanian and David Harrington of Kronos Quartet. The book was funded by the private sale of a limited edition run of thirteen works titled BookBeatBox. Each unique sculpture is both a hand-made brushed aluminum encasement for the book, and also a musical instrument powered by a hand-crank.
