= Susan Barnes (computing) =

American businesswoman

Susan Kelly Barnes is an alumna of Apple Inc. She was Controller of the Macintosh Division at Apple Computer. When Steve Jobs left Apple Computer in 1985, she joined Jobs and other Apple managers to cofound NeXT Computer, Inc. She served as Vice President and Chief Financial Officer of NeXT Computer from 1985 to 1991.

As NeXT's Chief Financial Officer, Ms. Barnes helped raise significant funding that helped NeXT weather its slow start. The most notable transaction was a $100 million investment by Canon Inc. in 1989 for a 16.7 percent stake in NeXT. That gave NeXT an implied total equity valuation of $600 million, astonishingly high for a company that was not yet shipping any products.

After leaving NeXT Computer, Susan Barnes was Chief Financial Officer of Intuitive Surgical from 1997 to 2005.
