= Rich Page =

American computer developer

Richard Page is an alumnus of Apple Inc. He was an Apple Fellow at Apple Computer in the 1980s, and later joined Steve Jobs at NeXT.

Rich was one of the first four Apple Fellows. He was awarded the Apple Fellow position for his efforts in graphics software development tools including compilers and hardware development. As an Apple Fellow, Rich prototyped Apple's first portable, color and 68020 based Macintosh computers. He was responsible for the decision to use the Motorola MC68000 family of microprocessors for Apple's Lisa and Macintosh computers and was instrumental in the initial design of the Lisa.

Rich was the second Fellow at Rambus contributing to lighting, RRAM and new memory technologies.

Rich was President and founder of Next Sierra. Next Sierra was a fabless semiconductor company which developed display drivers for active matrix OLED.

Rich Page was President and Founder of Sierra Research and Technology, Inc. Sierra provided 622M ATM, 10/100 Ethernet and Giga-bit Ethernet designs to more than 50 semiconductor and system companies. Sierra also provided a number of custom designs for large system companies. Sierra was acquired by TDK Semiconductor in 2000 to substantially expand TDK's networking engineering team.

Before founding Sierra, Rich was a co-founder and the Vice President of Hardware Engineering at NeXT Computer, Inc. He led the development of the Cube, NeXTstation and Turbo NeXTstation products. Later Rich became the general manager of the NeXT Hardware Division which included design engineering, materials management, manufacturing, service, order management and distribution.

In 1992, Rich Page left NeXT. Within weeks of his resignation, several NeXT VPs also left.

His experience in hardware and software design includes the development of microcode for Hewlett-Packard's HP 3000 minicomputer series. The HP3000 minicomputer is still in use today. At Fairchild Semiconductor, Rich developed test programs for Fairchild's microprocessors, memory products and custom chips.

Rich is chairman of the board at Chowbotics Inc, a start-up building food robotics products. The first product is Sally, a salad making robot.
