= Music Kit =

The Music Kit was a software package for the NeXT Computer system. First developed by David A. Jaffe and Julius O. Smith, it supported the Motorola 56001 DSP that was included on the NeXT Computer's motherboard. It was also the first architecture to unify the Music-N and MIDI paradigms. Thus it combined the generality of the former with the interactivity and performance capabilities of the latter. The Music Kit was integrated with the Sound Kit.

First demonstrated in 1988 at Davies Symphony Hall, the 1.0 release shipped in 1989 with the NeXT computer and included an Objective-C library for creating music and sound applications, a score language that included expression evaluation, MIDI, sound and DSP drivers, several command-line utilities and a simple score-playing application called ScorePlayer. The Music Kit was integrated into a variety of music applications, including Finale and Creation Station. It was also used in video games and even document processors.

The 2.0 release of the NeXT computer included additional bundled applications, including Ensemble, a fractal-based improvisation tool developed by Michael McNabb. Others involved in the NeXT Music Kit project included Douglas Fulton (documentation and demos), Doug Keislar (third-party support), Greg Kellogg (drivers), Lee Boynton (drivers, Sound Kit) and Dana Massie (development.) In addition, consultants brought in early on included Andy Moorer (DSP software architecture), Roger Dannenberg (data structures) and John Strawn (DSP software).

In 1992 (NeXT 3.0 release), the Music Kit was un-bundled from the NeXT software and was released as a copyrighted open source package to the Stanford Center for Computer Research in Music and Acoustics (CCRMA), where Julius O. Smith was a professor. Stanford University hired David A. Jaffe as a consultant to continue to develop the Music Kit. Among the additions at that time were support for the Airel QuintProcessor, a five-DSP board for the NeXTcube, support for audio directly via the DSP56001 serial port (which was brought out to the back of the NeXT cube), and support for NextSTEP and the use of DSP processing using the Turtle Beach DSP56001 card. A set of eight Motorola evaluation boards were combined into a chassis for the prototype "Frankenstein" platform, used by the Sondius program of the Stanford Office of Technology Licensing to develop physical models of musical instruments. In addition, Jaffe was hired by a third party to add MIDI time code support to the Music Kit. (The Sondius group was later spun off into an independent company, Staccato Systems, Inc., with funding from Yamaha and Stanford University. Staccato Systems, Inc. was acquired by Analog Devices in 2000.)

The Music Kit was described in numerous articles in NeXTWorld and other periodicals, and in books such as The Complete Guide to the Nextstep user environment.

More recent ports of the Music Kit were done by Leigh Smith and Stephen Brandon.
