= MacWorks XL =

Apple Lisa computer program

- Developer: Apple Computer
- Initial release: April 1984; 41 years ago
- Operating system: Classic Mac OS

MacWorks XL is an Apple Lisa computer program which shipped with the Macintosh XL. It allows 64K Apple Macintosh ROM emulation so the Macintosh XL can run classic Mac OS programs.

== History ==
Soon after the debut of the Macintosh, which sold over 50,000 units in the first 100 days compared to only a few thousand Lisas during its entire first year, it became clear to Apple that the Lisa (then Lisa 2/10) would benefit from the ability to run the Macintosh system software as well as reduce the development platform resources required to maintain two separate operating systems.

In April 1984, Apple introduced MacWorks v1.0 for the Lisa. It allowed the Lisa to run a Macintosh environment from a floppy disk, but did not support a hard disk environment. By the fall, Apple had introduced versions 2.0 & 3.0 which allowed MacWorks to run from the Lisa's internal Widget or attached ProFile hard disk. With the introduction of the re-branded Macintosh XL in January 1985, MacWorks was likewise renamed for the release.

== Features ==
MacWorks XL shipped on two diskettes. The first booted the Lisa into the Mac OS bootloader. When that process completed, the system displayed an entirely white screen, ejected the first disk, and displayed the usual blinking question mark (with a Macintosh XL graphic below it) to indicate that a boot volume (the second disk) was needed. With this disk, titled the "MacWorks XL System Disk", the Lisa would boot Macintosh System 5.

When the Lisa was discontinued, Sun Remarketing continued development of the MacWorks environment under license up to the release of MacWorks Plus 1.1 (which supports System Software 6). Dafax Processing Corp. with the assistance of Query Engineering, Inc. then further developed the environment to MacWorks Plus II which will support up to System 7.5 along with all other late model Motorola 68000-based Macs.

== Timeline of Macintosh operating systems ==
Timeline of Mac operating systems
