= George Crow =

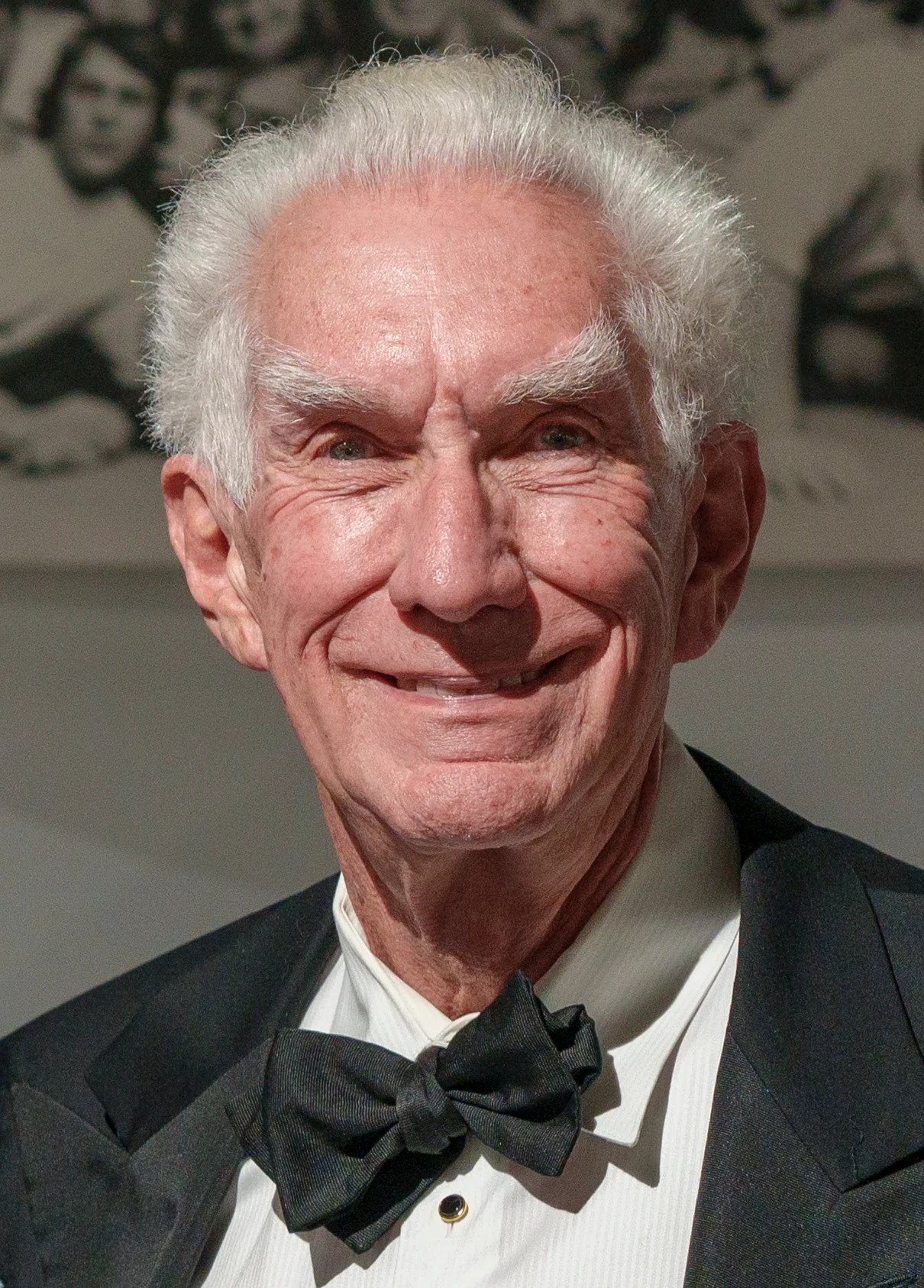
George Crow in 2026

George L. Crow Jr. was a member of the original Apple Macintosh team in 1984 at Apple Computer. Crow left Apple in 1985 to become a co-founder of Steve Jobs' NeXT. Prior to working at Apple, Crow worked at Hewlett-Packard; after leaving NeXT he worked for UMAX Computer Corporation and then Truevision. In 1999, Crow came back to Apple, recalling that the general atmosphere was still similar to how it was in the 1980s. In 2006, he retired.

He received a B.S. degree from the University of California, Berkeley and his master's degree from Santa Clara University.
