= Andrew Schloss =

American composer and computer engineer (born 1952)

Andrew Schloss (né Walter Andrew Schloss; born 1952 Hartford, Connecticut) is an American musician and computer engineer.

== Career ==
Schloss is perhaps best known for his work with the radiodrum, a three-dimensional midi-controller. Schloss is a pioneer in computer-music technology, and worked at IRCAM and the CCRMA in the 1980s. He has performed with Léon Theremin, Laurie Anderson, Tito Puente, Chucho Valdés, David A. Jaffe and Peter Brook. He has collaborated extensively with David A. Jaffe, who has composed a variety of works for him, including "The Seven Wonders of the Ancient World," for radiodrum-performed Disklavier and ensemble. Schloss teaches at the University of Victoria and heads the Music Computer Science joint degree program.

Schloss earned a PhD in 1985 from Stanford University, where he worked at CCRMA – the Center for Computer Research in Music and Acoustics.

== Selected technography ==
10. Vol. 15: The Virtuoso in the Computer Age – V: Music For the Matthews/Boie Radio Drum and Radio Baton (1994)
  1. David A. Jaffe and Andrew Schloss, "Wildlife," for Zeta violin & radio drum (music for the [Max] Matthews and [Bob] Boie radio drum and radio baton); David Jaffe (Zeta violin) and Andrew Schloss (radio drum) (1994)
    1. Part 1: "Sonata "Sacre"
    2. Part 2: "The Most Religious"
    3. Part 3: "Reversed Orbits"
    4. Part 4: "Oracular and Prophetic"
    5. Part 5: "Edible Trance"
  Centaur CRC 2190
  Discogs release ID 1773079.
  Allmusic album ID mw0001371262.
  OCLC 889982094, 767690601, 911745337, 986753145, 30941232, 778855005, 1180811331.

== Bibliography ==
=== References ===
- Fuller, Amy Elisabeth, ed. (2013). "Andrew Schloss". Contemporary Authors: a bio-bibliographical guide to current writers in fiction, general nonfiction, poetry, journalism, drama, motion pictures, television, and other fields. Vol. 327. Gale. ISBN 978-1-4144-8183-8, 1-4144-8183-7, ISSN 0010-7468, OCLC 810280741.
- Matthews, Max Vernon (1926–2011); Boie, Robert Albert (born 1939); Schloss, Andrew (1989). "The Radio Drum as a Synthesizer Controller". Proceedings of the International Computer Music Association Conference, San Francisco. 1989. hdl:2027/spo.bbp2372.1989.010. OCLC 832793790 (all editions) (article).
- Nevile, Ben (interviewer); Schloss, Andrew (interviewee) (September 14, 2005). "An Interview With Andrew Schloss". Cycling '74 (blog). The interview was at Schloss' home in Seattle. Schloss, in 1996, was a member of the Examining Committee for Ben Nevile's masters thesis for Master of Applied Science degree in the Department of Interdisciplinary Studies, University of Victoria: "Gesture Analysis Through a Computer’s Audio Interface: The Audio-Input Drum."
- Schloss, Walter Andrew (1985). On the Automatic Transcription of Percussive Music: From Acoustic Signal to High-Level Analysis (PhD dissertation). Palo Alto: Stanford University. OCLC 221337201 (all editions).

=== Primary sources ===
- "W. Andrew Schloss – Professor Electronic & Computer Music, Acoustics, Ethnomusicology". University of Victoria, School of Music (bio – faculty website).
