= Sun Remarketing =

American retail store

Sun Remarketing, Inc.
- Formerly: Cook's, Inc. (1979–1983)
- Type: Private
- Industry: Retail
- Founded: 1979; 47 years ago
- Founder: Robert L. "Bob" Cook
- Defunct: 2006; 20 years ago
- Fate: Acquired by Cherokee Data

Sun Remarketing, Inc. (originally Cook's, Inc. before 1983) was a retail company that specialized in reselling old Apple Computer software and hardware. It was founded by Robert L. "Bob" Cook in 1979.

== Apple Lisa ==
In 1985, Sun Remarketing purchased between 5,000 and 7,000 unsold Apple Lisa computers from Apple Computer after the latter had discontinued it in September that year. The company had also acquired 3,500 unsold Apple III computers and thousands of used and broken Lisas from surrounding businesses in the same year. Sun sold roughly thousands of these consigned Lisas between 1985 and 1989, the company modernizing the machines by retrofitting them with 800-KB 3.5-inch floppy disk drives and 20-MB hard drives. Sun began reselling Apple's Macintosh line of computers in 1988, including Macintosh Plus, Macintosh SE, and Macintosh II, after years of having only sold the Lisa, Apple II, and Apple III. In September 1989, Apple took the remaining 2,700 in their warehouse (which they had consigned to Sun) and buried them at a landfill in Logan, Utah.

Sun Remarketing bought the MacWorks XL emulator from Apple in the 1980s to spur sales of the Lisa computers by making them able to run Macintosh applications. Following the introduction of the Macintosh Plus by Apple with its enhanced 128K ROM, many new Macintosh applications no longer worked under MacWorks XL. To clear its remaining inventory, Sun Remarketing took the bold step of underwriting the development of a new emulator called MacWorks Plus which fully supported the 128K ROM on the Lisa hardware, and packaged it together as the Lisa Professional.

== Demise ==
Sun Remarketing was also known locally within Cache Valley as one of the first commercial internet service providers in Northern Utah. In 2006, Sun Remarketing was bought out by Cherokee Data, a computer wholesaler in Oklahoma.

A second company using the name Cherokee Data Solutions (aka CDS) is unrelated and unaffiliated with either Cherokee Data or Sun Remarketing.
