= Apple Lisa =

Personal computer by Apple Inc.

Lisa

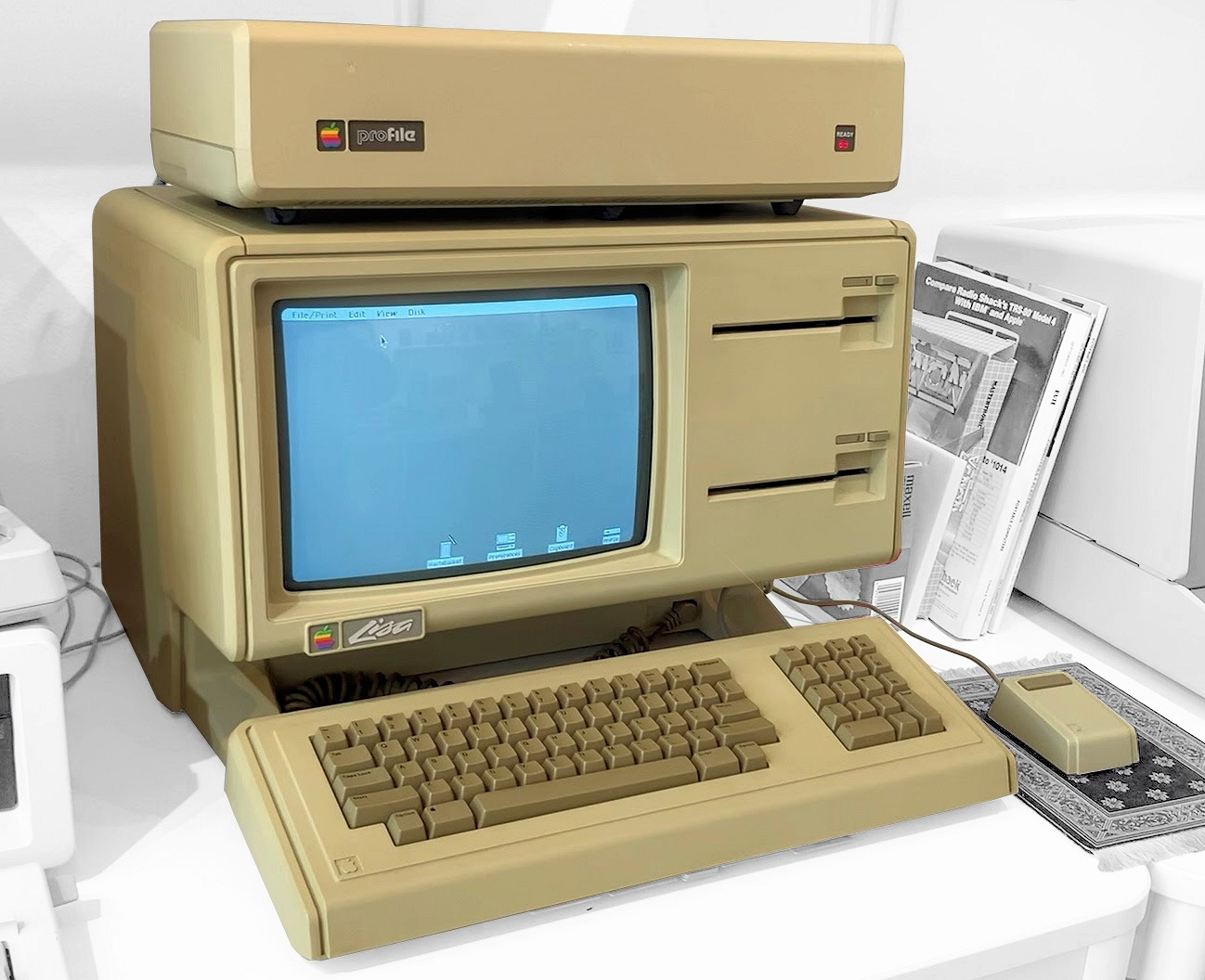
- This Lisa has dual 5.25" FileWare floppy drives and a 5 MB ProFile hard disk.
- Also known as: Local Integrated Software Architecture
- Developer: Apple Computer
- Manufacturer: Apple Computer
- Type: Personal computer
- Released: January 19, 1983; 43 years ago
- Introductory price: US$9,995 (equivalent to $32,300 in 2025)
- Discontinued: August 1, 1986; 40 years ago
- Units sold: 10,000 – 60,000
- Operating system: Lisa OS, Xenix, others
- CPU: Motorola 68000 @ 5 MHz
- Memory: 1 MB, expandable to 2 MB
- Display: 12-inch monochrome, 720 × 364
- Input: Keyboard and mouse
- Weight: 48 lb (22 kg)
- Successor: Lisa 2 Macintosh XL

Lisa is a line of desktop computers that were designed, manufactured and sold by Apple Computer. It was the first mass-market computer operable through a graphical user interface (GUI). The Lisa was primarily marketed to individual and small and medium-sized businesses as a groundbreaking and simpler new alternative to much bigger, more complex and more expensive mainframes or minicomputers, such as those from IBM.

Development of the Lisa began in 1978; Apple co-founder Steve Jobs received demonstrations of GUI technology being developed by Xerox's Palo Alto Research Center (PARC), some of which would inspire aspects of the computer's operating system. The Lisa was based on the Motorola 68000 microprocessor, and utilized an operating system with a window-and-mouse-driven interface, a document-oriented workflow, memory protection, and a pre-loaded office suite.

Apple officially unveiled the Lisa on January 19, 1983, with a base price of US$9,995 (equivalent to $32,300 in 2025) for a model equipped with a five-megabyte hard drive. While receiving critical acclaim for its technical innovations (especially in comparison to the IBM Personal Computer), the Lisa faced criticism for its lack of third-party software, unreliable FileWare ("Twiggy") floppy disks, and its high, workstation-level price. The Lisa's CPU and storage performance were hampered by cost-cutting measures and the complexity of its software, including its use of an ad hoc protected memory implementation rather than using a hardware memory management unit.

In 1981, after Jobs was forced out of the Lisa project by Apple's board of directors, he appropriated the Macintosh project from Jef Raskin, who had conceived it in 1979 as a sub-$1,000 (equivalent to $4,400 in 2025) text-based appliance computer. Jobs gradually retooled the Macintosh into a graphical computer similar to the Lisa (sharing its Motorola 68K processor), but at a lower price point, and with a more intuitive user interface. The imminent unveiling and release of the Macintosh cannibalized interest in the Lisa, even though it had superior hardware (including hard disk drive support, up to 2 megabytes (MB) of RAM expansion slots, and a larger, higher-resolution display).

Newer Lisa models addressed the shortcomings of the original, while Apple later released MacWorks—a program that allowed the Lisa to run the Macintosh system software (and in turn, Macintosh software). Even with a major price reduction, the Lisa platform failed to achieve sales volumes comparable to the much less expensive Macintosh, with estimated units sold during its two years of availability ranging from 10,000 to 60,000. The final revision of the Lisa would be reissued as a stopgap high-end Mac known as the Macintosh XL, which shipped with a 3.5" floppy drive and MacWorks.

== History ==
=== Development ===
==== Name ====
Though the original documentation only refers to it as "The Lisa", Apple officially stated that the name was an acronym for "Local Integrated Software Architecture". Because Steve Jobs's first daughter was named Lisa (born in 1978), it was sometimes inferred that the name also had a personal association, and perhaps that the acronym was a backronym contrived later to fit the name. Andy Hertzfeld said that the acronym was reverse-engineered from the name "Lisa" in late 1982 by the Apple marketing team after they had hired a marketing consultancy firm to find names to replace "Lisa" and "Macintosh" (at the time considered by Jef Raskin to be merely internal project codenames) and then rejected all of the suggestions. Privately, Hertzfeld and the other software developers used "Lisa: Invented Stupid Acronym", a recursive backronym, and computer industry pundits coined the term "Let's Invent Some Acronym" to fit Lisa's name. Decades later, Jobs told his biographer Walter Isaacson: "Obviously it was named for my daughter."

==== Research and design ====
The project began in 1978 as an effort to create a more modern version of the then-conventional design epitomized by the Apple II. A ten-person team occupied its first dedicated office at 20863 Stevens Creek Boulevard next to the Good Earth restaurant, and nicknamed "the Good Earth building". Initial team leader Ken Rothmuller was soon replaced by John Couch, under whose direction the project evolved into the "window-and-mouse-driven" form of its eventual release. Trip Hawkins and Jef Raskin contributed to this change in design. Apple's co-founder Steve Jobs was involved in the concept.

At Xerox's Palo Alto Research Center (PARC), research had already been underway for several years to create a new humanized way to organize the computer screen, which became known as the desktop metaphor. Steve Jobs visited PARC in 1979 and was absorbed and excited by the revolutionary mouse-driven GUI of the Alto. By late 1979, Jobs successfully negotiated a sale of Apple stock to Xerox, in exchange for his Lisa team receiving two demonstrations of ongoing research projects at PARC. When the Apple team saw the demonstration of the Alto computer, they were able to see in action the basic elements of what constituted a workable GUI. The Lisa team put a great deal of work into making the graphical interface a mainstream commercial product.

The Lisa was a major project at Apple, which reportedly spent more than $50 million on its development. More than 90 people participated in the design, plus more in the sales and marketing effort, to launch the machine. BYTE magazine credited Wayne Rosing with being the most important person in the development of the computer's hardware until the machine went into production, at which point he became the technical lead for the entire Lisa project. The hardware development team was headed by Robert Paratore. The industrial design, product design, and mechanical packaging were headed by Bill Dresselhaus, the Principal Product Designer of Lisa, with his team of internal product designers and contract product designers from the firm that eventually became IDEO. Bruce Daniels was in charge of applications development, and Larry Tesler was in charge of system software.

The user interface was designed in six months, after which the hardware, operating system, and applications were all created in parallel. During the formulation of the Lisa as a product, the applications and graphical user interface of the Xerox Alto were influential in defining the machine's capabilities. With Xerox yet to introduce its Star workstation, only the Xerox 860 featured amongst the competitors identified for the Lisa. However, the Three Rivers Computer Corporation PERQ was described as "closest to the spirit of LISA" that "in many ways exceeds it", with its US$19,500 price acknowledged as justifiably expensive. Nevertheless, the Xerox Star did influence the design of the Lisa's user interface, leading to the introduction to the Lisa of a "completely different" desktop manager featuring icons.

In 1980, Steve Jobs was forced out of the Lisa project, and he appropriated Jef Raskin's existing Macintosh project. Raskin had conceived and led Macintosh since 1979 as a text-based appliance computer. Jobs redefined Macintosh as a cheaper and more usable form of Lisa's concepts, and led the skunkworks project with substantial motivation to compete in parallel with the Lisa team.

In September 1981, below the announcement of the IBM PC, InfoWorld reported on Lisa, "McIntosh", and another Apple computer secretly under development "to be ready for release within a year". It described Lisa as having a 68000 processor and 128KB RAM, and "designed to compete with the new Xerox Star at a considerably lower price". In May 1982, the magazine reported that "Apple's yet-to-be-announced Lisa 68000 network work station is also widely rumored to have a mouse." BYTE reported similar rumors that month.

=== Launch ===
Lisa was announced on January 19, 1983. By then, the press discussed rumors of Macintosh as a much less-expensive Apple computer with similar functionality, perhaps planned for late 1983. Apple Confidential said, "Even before the Lisa began shipping in June, the press was full of intentionally-leaked rumors about a fall release of a 'baby Lisa' that would work in much the same way, only faster and cheaper. Its name: Macintosh." Lisa's low sales were quickly surpassed by the January 1984 launch of the Macintosh. Newer versions of the Lisa were introduced that addressed its faults and lowered its price considerably, but it failed to achieve sales comparable to the much less expensive Mac. The Macintosh project assimilated a lot more Lisa staff. The final revision, the Lisa 2/10, was modified and sold as the Macintosh XL.

=== Discontinuation ===
The high cost and the delays in its release date contributed to the Lisa's discontinuation although it was repackaged and sold at $4,995, as the Lisa 2. In 1986, the entire Lisa platform was discontinued.

In 1987, Sun Remarketing purchased about 5,000 Macintosh XLs and upgraded them. In 1989, with the help of Sun Remarketing, Apple disposed of approximately 2,700 unsold Lisa units in a guarded landfill in Logan, Utah, to receive a tax write-off on the unsold inventory. Some leftover Lisa computers and spare parts were available until Cherokee Data (which purchased Sun Remarketing) went out of business.

== Overview ==
=== Hardware ===
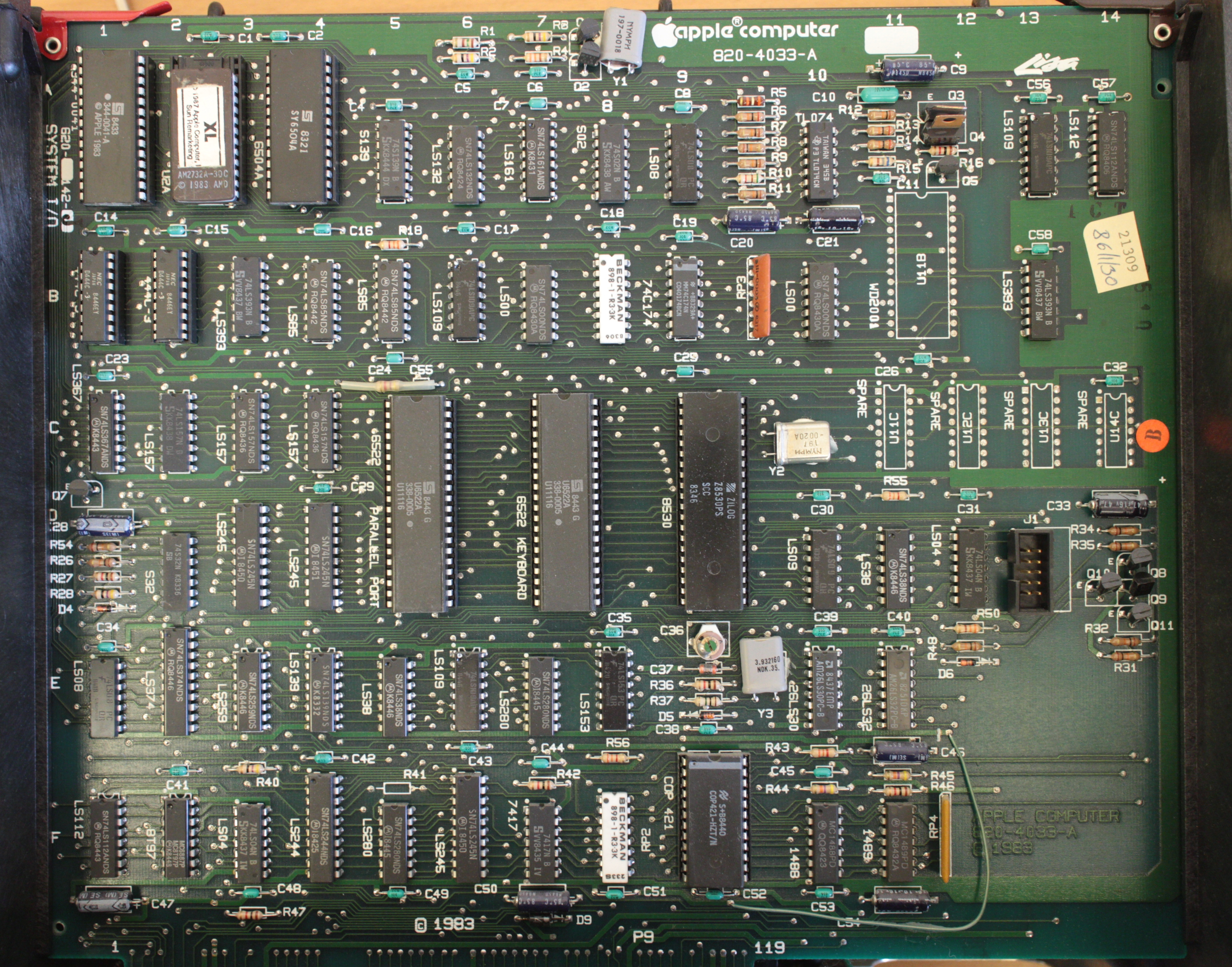
This Lisa I/O board has a Macintosh XL UV-EPROM installed.

The Lisa was first introduced on January 19, 1983. It is one of the first personal computer systems with a graphical user interface (GUI) to be sold commercially. It uses a Motorola 68000 CPU clocked at 5 MHz and has 1 MB of RAM. It can be upgraded to 2 MB and later shipped with as little as 512 kilobytes. The CPU speed and model were not changed from the release of the Lisa 1 to the repackaging of the hardware as Macintosh XL.

The real-time clock uses a 4-bit integer and the base year is defined as 1980; the software won't accept any value below 1981, so the only valid range is 1981–1995. The real-time clock depends on a 4 × AA-cell NiCd pack of batteries that only lasts for a few hours when main power is not present. Prone to failure over time, the battery packs could leak corrosive alkaline electrolyte and ruin the circuit boards.

The integrated monochrome black-on-white monitor has 720 × 364 rectangular pixels on a 12-inch (30 cm) screen.

Lisa's printer support includes Apple's Dot Matrix, Daisy Wheel, and ImageWriter dot matrix printers, and Canon's new color inkjet technology.

The original Lisa, later called the Lisa 1, has two FileWare 5.25-inch double-sided variable-speed floppy disk drives, more commonly known by Apple's codename "Twiggy". They have what was then a very high capacity of approximately 871 kB each, but are unreliable and use proprietary diskettes. Competing systems with high diskette data storage have much larger 8" floppy disks, seen as cumbersome and old-fashioned for a consumer system.

Lisa 1's innovations include block sparing, to reserve blocks in case of bad blocks, even on floppy disks. Critical operating system information has redundant storage, for recovery in case of corruption.

==== Lisa (1983) ====
The original Lisa Computer (Lisa 1) was introduced in January 1983 and began shipping in June 1983. The machine was powered by a 5 MHz Motorola 68000 processor with an integrated monochrome black-on-white monitor having 720 × 364 rectangular pixels displayed on a 12-inch (30 cm) screen. The computer shipped with two "Twiggy" floppy disk drives along with Lisa OS and office productivity software. The interface included a detached keyboard, a "thin button" mouse, with a parallel port for Apple ProFile external hard drive(s), and three (3) expansion slots for future upgrades. The Lisa launched in January 1983 at a cost of $9,995.

==== Lisa 2 (1984–1985) ====
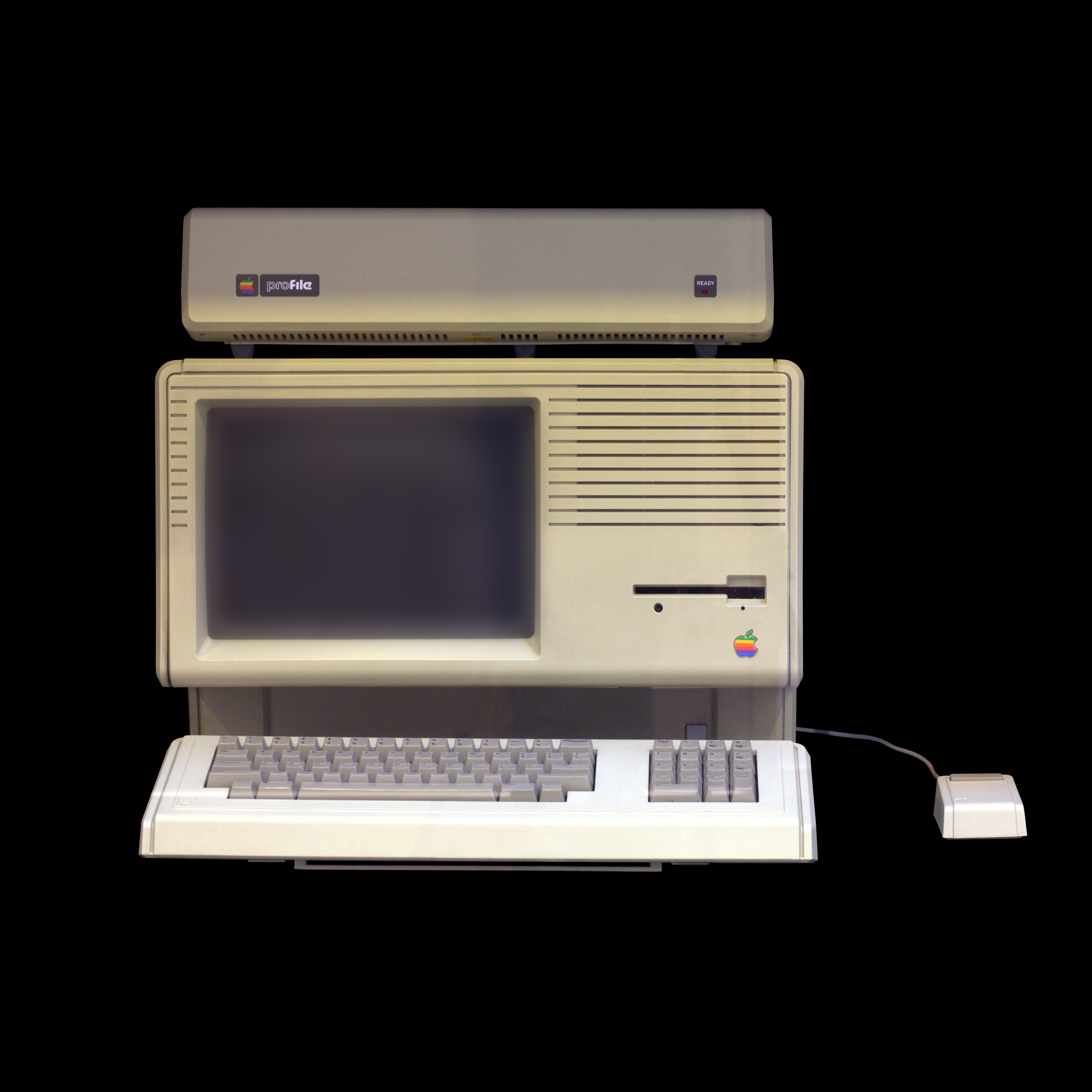
Lisa 2

The second hardware revision, the Lisa 2, was released in January 1984 and was priced between $3,495 and $5,495. It was much less expensive than the original model, and dropped the Twiggy floppy drives in favor of a single 400K Sony microfloppy. The Lisa 2 has as little as 512 KB of RAM.

The Lisa 2 line of products included the Lisa 2/5 which consisted of a Lisa 2 bundled with an external ProFile hard drive (5 megabyte capacity) or Lisa 2/10 with external ProFile hard drive (10 megabyte capacity).

Owners of the original Lisa (1983) computer with Twiggy drives and software were offered free upgrades to the Lisa 2. The upgrade replaced the pair of Twiggy drives with a single 3.5-inch drive, and updating the boot ROM and I/O ROM and modification to the I/O board. The upgrade included the new Lisa 2's new front faceplate to accommodate the newer microdisk (400K) drive which incorporated the new inlaid Apple logo. This faceplate was the first to incorporate Apples Snow White design language elements.

Developing early Macintosh software required a Lisa 2. There were relatively few third-party hardware offerings for the Lisa, as compared to the earlier Apple II—AST offered a 1.5 MB memory board which, when combined with the standard Apple 512 KB memory board, expanded the Lisa to a total of 2 MB of memory, the maximum amount that the MMU can address.

Late in the product life of the Lisa, there were third-party hard disk drives, SCSI controllers, and double-sided 3.5-inch floppy-disk upgrades. Unlike the original Macintosh, the Lisa has expansion slots. The Lisa 2 motherboard has a very basic backplane with virtually no electronic components, but plenty of edge connector sockets and slots. There are two RAM slots, one CPU upgrade slot, and one I/O slot, all in parallel. At the other end are three Lisa slots in parallel.

Late in 1984, the Lisa 2/10 spun off another variation that incorporated an internal 10 MB hard drive (Widget Drive), a modified motherboard removing the parallel port and internal cards, with upgraded power supply, along with the standard configuration of 1 MB of RAM. There was no upgrade path for this configuration as the hardware and wiring harness was electrically incompatible with the original Lisa 1 or 2 chassis.

===== Macintosh XL (1985–1986) =====
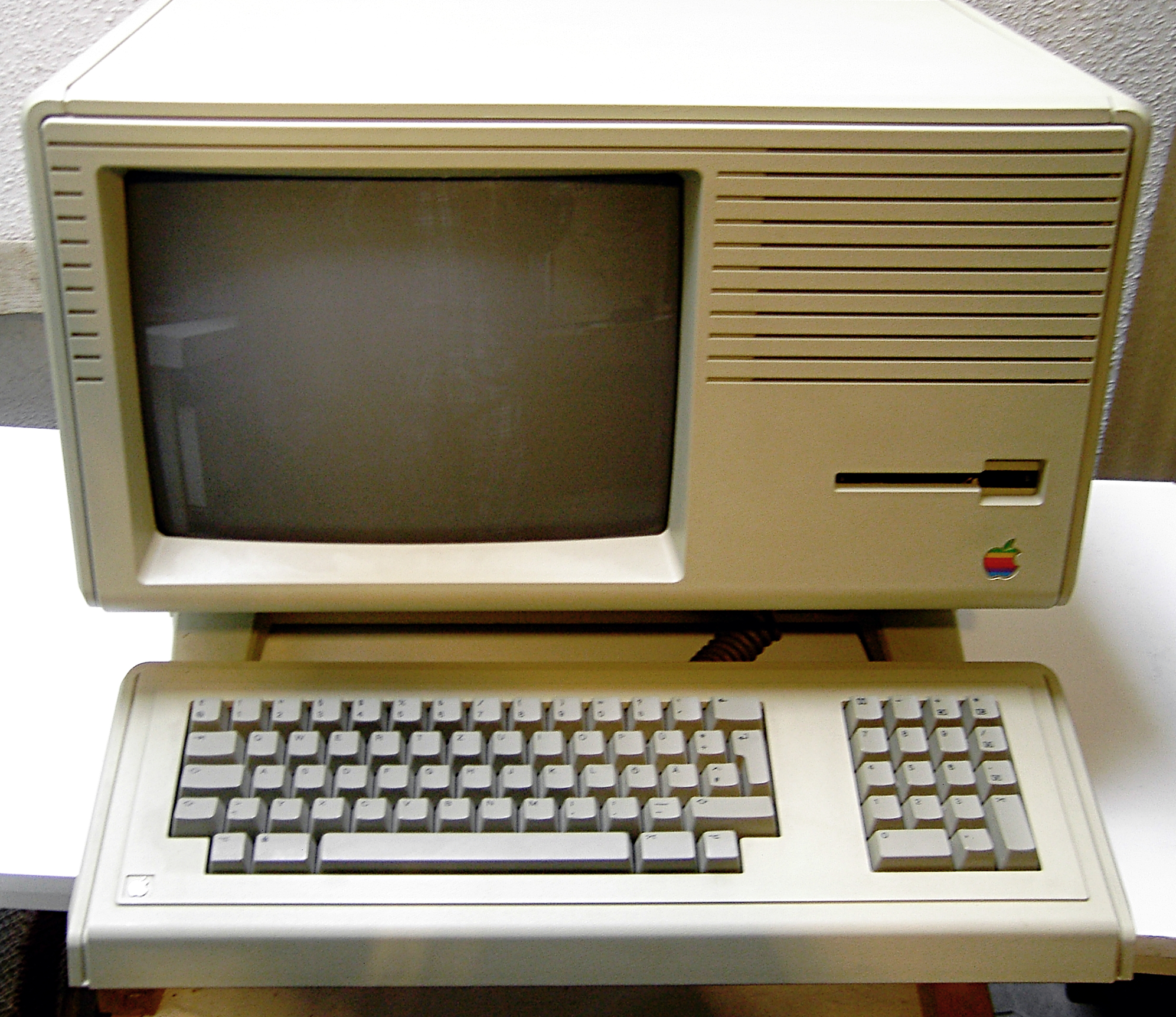
Macintosh XL

In January 1985, following the release of the Macintosh, the Lisa 2/10 (with integrated 10 MB hard drive) was rebranded as Macintosh XL. positioning it as the high-end Macintosh. The price was lowered yet again, to $4,000, and sales tripled, but CEO John Sculley said that Apple would have lost money increasing production to meet the new demand. There was an upgrade kit for Lisa computers that included a hardware and software kit, enabling it to reboot into Macintosh mode and display square pixels in place of the rectangular pixels of the Lisa.

Apple discontinued the Macintosh XL, leaving an eight-month void in Apple's high-end product line until the Macintosh Plus was introduced in 1986.

=== Software ===
Lisa Office System 3.1

==== Lisa OS ====
The Lisa operating system features protected memory, enabled by a crude hardware circuit compared to the Sun-1 workstation (c. 1982), which features a full memory management unit. Motorola did not have an MMU (memory-management unit) for the 68000 ready in time, so third parties developed their own. Apple's is also the result of a cost-cutting compromise, with sluggish performance. Based, in part, on elements from the Apple III SOS operating system released three years earlier, Lisa's disk operating system also organizes its files in hierarchical directories. File system directories correspond to GUI folders, as with previous Xerox PARC computers from which Lisa borrowed heavily. Lisa was designed around a hard drive, unlike the first Macintosh.

Lisa has two main user modes: the Lisa Office System and the Workshop. The Lisa Office System is the GUI environment for end users. The Workshop is a program development environment and is almost entirely text-based, though it uses a GUI text editor. The Lisa Office System was eventually renamed 7/7 which refers to the seven supplied application programs: LisaWrite, LisaCalc, LisaDraw, LisaGraph, LisaProject, LisaList, and LisaTerminal.

Apple's warranty said that this software works precisely as stated, and Apple refunded an unspecified number of users, in full, for their systems. These operating system frailties, and costly recalls, combined with the very high price point, led to the failure of the Lisa in the marketplace.

In 2018, the Computer History Museum announced it would be releasing the source code for Lisa OS, following a check by Apple to ensure this would not impact other intellectual property. For copyright reasons, this release does not include the American Heritage dictionary. For its 40th anniversary on January 19, 2023, the source code of Lisa OS Software version 3.1 was made available under an Apple Academic License Agreement.

==== MacWorks ====
In April 1984, following the Macintosh launch, Apple introduced MacWorks, a software emulation environment enabling Lisa to run Macintosh System software and applications. MacWorks improved Lisa's market appeal. After the early Macintosh operating system first gained hard disk support, MacWorks also gained access to Lisa's hard disk in September. In January 1985, MacWorks was re-branded MacWorks XL as the primary system application, to convert the Lisa into the Macintosh XL.

==== Third-party software ====
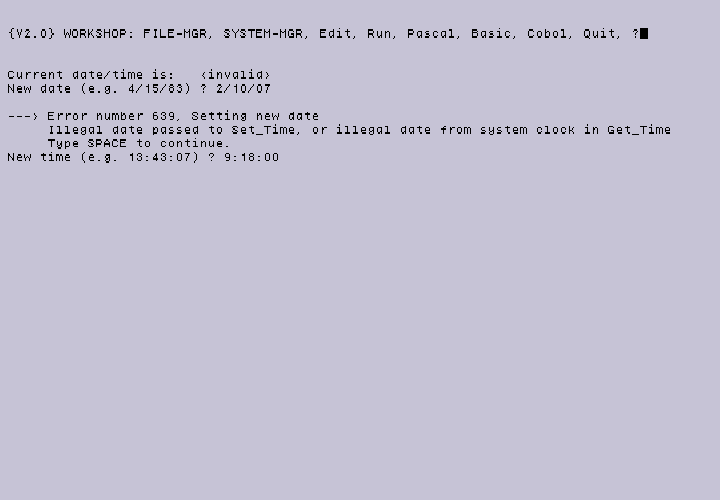
Lisa Workshop

The launch version of Lisa Office System cannot be used for programming, requiring the separate development OS called Lisa Workshop to be toggled and booted. Lisa Workshop was also used to develop Macintosh software for its first few years, until a Macintosh-native development system was released. For most of its lifetime, the Lisa only had the original seven applications that Apple had deemed enough to "do everything". UniPress Software released UNIX System III for $495 (equivalent to $1,600 in 2025).

Santa Cruz Operation (SCO) published Microsoft Xenix (version 3), a Unix-like command-line operating system for the Lisa 2, and Microsoft's Multiplan 2.1 spreadsheet for Xenix. Other Lisa Xenix apps include Quadratron's Q-Office suite.

UniPress Software also provided a version of Unix System V for the Lisa 2, offering a C compiler and "Berkeley enhancements" such as vi and the C shell, supporting hard drives ranging from 20 MB to 100 MB along with Ethernet connectivity. Additional applications could be purchased from UniPress, and a less expensive single-user edition was also sold for $495 (equivalent to $1,500 in 2025) alongside the $1,495 (equivalent to $4,600 in 2025) multi-user edition. A variety of other programming languages were supported by the operating system.

== Reception ==
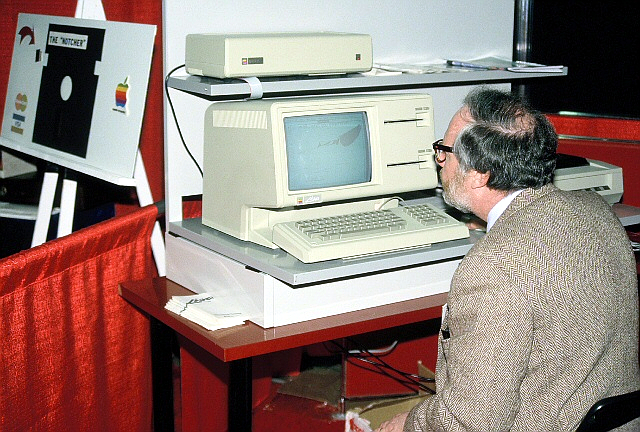
An original Lisa is at work at the Apple Convention in Boston, in early 1983.

BYTE previewed the Lisa and wrote in February 1983 that it was "the most important development in computers in the last five years, easily outpacing [the IBM PC]". It acknowledged that the $9,995 price was high, and concluded "Apple ... is not unaware that most people would be incredibly interested in a similar but less expensive machine. We'll see what happens".

The Lisa 2 was received more favourably by BYTE in December 1984, describing it as possibly "the most underrated machine in the history of the microcomputer industry ... more versatile and powerful than any other machine in its under-$7000 price category". Priced from $3,495, the base model was largely perceived as a "wide-screen Macintosh" with four times the memory of that machine and able to run its software, but nevertheless "the only practical way to run even moderately large Macintosh applications" at that time. Hard disk models were priced from $4,495, and the range of supported hard disk sizes, along with the "large memory", were seen as contributing to the machine's versatility. The provision of a character-based display support was seen as "critical to XENIX and UNIX users", and the availability of these other operating systems also served to differentiate the Lisa from the Macintosh. System performance had also improved from the original Lisa product.

The Lisa was a commercial failure, the company's largest since the Apple III of 1980. Apple sold a total of approximately 10,000 – 60,000 Lisa machines at US$9,995 (equivalent to about $32,300 in 2025) each, generating total sales of $100 million against a development cost of more than $150 million. The largest Lisa customer was NASA, which used LisaProject for project management. The marketing requirements document for the Lisa project had envisaged production of at least 20,000 units per year, stating sales goals of around 45,000 units for the first two years, and potential total sales of 250,000 units in the period starting from 1981 and extending beyond 1986. The lifespan of the product was itself envisaged as ten years, with hardware refinements to be periodically introduced to bring end-user pricing down from the desired US$5,000 to below US$3,000 by 1984.

The Lisa 2 and its Mac ROM-enabled Macintosh XL version are the final two releases in the Lisa line, which was discontinued in April 1985. The Macintosh XL is a hardware and software conversion kit to effectively reboot Lisa into Macintosh mode. In 1986, Apple offered all Lisa and XL owners the opportunity to return their computer and pay $1,498, in exchange for a Macintosh Plus and Hard Disk 20. Reportedly, 2,700 working but unsold Lisa computers were buried in a landfill.

== Legacy ==
Apple's culture of object-oriented programming on Lisa contributed to the 1988 conception of Pink, the first attempt to re-architect the operating system of Macintosh.

In 1989, after Wayne Rosing had moved to Sun Microsystems, he reflected on his time at Apple, recalling that building the Lisa had been hard work. He said the system's hard disk and RAM was a requirement and not a luxury, but that the system remains slow. He noted that, by 1989, Lisa's level of integration between applications had not yet been repeated by Apple.

Original "Twiggy" based Lisa 1 systems command high prices at auction due to the scarcity of surviving examples. The auction record for a Lisa 1 was set on September 10, 2024, when a Lisa from the estate of Microsoft co-founder Paul Allen was sold for $882,000.

== See also ==
- Bill Atkinson
- Rich Page
- Brad Silverberg
- History of the graphical user interface
- Cut, copy, and paste
- Visi On
- GEMDOS (adaptation for Lisa 2/5)
