= Apple University Consortium =

Partnership between Apple and Australian universities

The Apple University Consortium was a partnership between Apple Australia and a number of Australian universities, formed in 1985.

Every two years it held the AUC Academic & Developers Conference. It also sponsored subsidised seats to the WWDC conference in San Francisco each year for university staff and students. As of September 28, 2012 Apple ceased funding the AUC.

There was a separate organization called the Apple University Consortium that united American universities, also formed in the 1980s.

== Members ==
=== Western Australia ===
- Curtin University of Technology, Perth, Western Australia
- Edith Cowan University, Perth, Western Australia
- Murdoch University, Perth, Western Australia
- The University of Western Australia, Perth, Western Australia

=== South Australia ===
- The Flinders University of South Australia, Adelaide, South Australia
- The University of Adelaide, Adelaide, South Australia
- The University of South Australia, Adelaide, South Australia

=== Victoria ===
- Deakin University, Geelong, Victoria
- La Trobe University, Melbourne, Victoria
- Monash University, Melbourne, Victoria
- Swinburne University, Melbourne, Victoria
- Victoria University of Technology, Melbourne, Victoria
- The University of Melbourne, Melbourne, Victoria
- Royal Melbourne Institute of Technology, Melbourne, Victoria

=== Tasmania ===
- The University of Tasmania, Hobart, Tasmania

=== New South Wales ===
- Charles Sturt University, Wagga Wagga, New South Wales
- Macquarie University, Sydney, New South Wales
- Southern Cross University, Lismore, New South Wales
- The University of New England, Armidale, New South Wales
- The University of New South Wales, Sydney, New South Wales
- The University of Newcastle, Newcastle, New South Wales
- The University of Sydney, Sydney, New South Wales
- The University of Technology, Sydney, Sydney, New South Wales
- The University of Western Sydney, Sydney, New South Wales
- The University of Wollongong, Wollongong, New South Wales

=== ACT (Canberra) ===
- The Australian National University, Canberra, Australian Capital Territory

=== Queensland ===
- Central Queensland University, Rockhampton, Queensland
- Griffith University, Brisbane, Queensland
- James Cook University, Townsville, Queensland
- The University of Queensland, Brisbane,
- The University of Southern Queensland, Toowoomba, Queensland

== Associate members ==
- Australian Defence Force Academy, Canberra (through ANU)
- The University of Canberra, Canberra (through ANU)
- Queensland University of Technology, Brisbane, Queensland (through Uni Qld)
- The University of the Sunshine Coast, Maroochydore, Queensland (through Griffith Uni)
- SAE Institute, Byron Bay, NSW (through Southern Cross University)
