= XcodeGhost =

Malware versions of Apple's Xcode IDE

XcodeGhost (and variant XcodeGhost S) are modified versions of Apple's Xcode development environment that are considered malware. The software first gained widespread attention in September 2015, when a number of apps originating from China harbored the malicious code. It was thought to be the "first large-scale attack on Apple's App Store", according to the BBC. The problems were first identified by researchers at Alibaba, a leading e-commerce firm in China. Over 4000 apps are infected, according to FireEye, far more than the 25 initially acknowledged by Apple, including apps from authors outside China.

Security firm Palo Alto Networks surmised that because network speeds were slower in China, developers in the country looked for local copies of the Apple Xcode development environment, and encountered altered versions that had been posted on domestic web sites. This opened the door for the malware to be inserted into high profile apps used on iOS devices.

Even two months after the initial reports, security firm FireEye reported that hundreds of enterprises were still using infected apps and that XcodeGhost remained "a persistent security risk". The firm also identified a new variant of the malware and dubbed it XcodeGhost S; among the apps that were infected were the popular messaging app WeChat and a Netease app Music 163.

== Discovery ==
On September 16, 2015, a Chinese iOS developer mentioned on the social network Sina Weibo that malware in Xcode injects third party code into apps compiled with it.

Alibaba researchers then published detailed information on the malware and called it XcodeGhost.

On September 17, 2015, Palo Alto Networks published several reports on the malware.

== Operation ==
=== Propagation ===
Because of the slow download speed from Apple servers, Chinese iOS developers would download Xcode from third party websites, such as Baidu Yun (now called Baidu WangPan), a cloud storage service hosted by Baidu, or get copies from co-workers. Attackers took advantage of this situation by distributing compromised versions on such file hosting websites.

Palo Alto Networks suspects that the malware was available in March 2015.

=== Attack vector ===
==== Origins ====
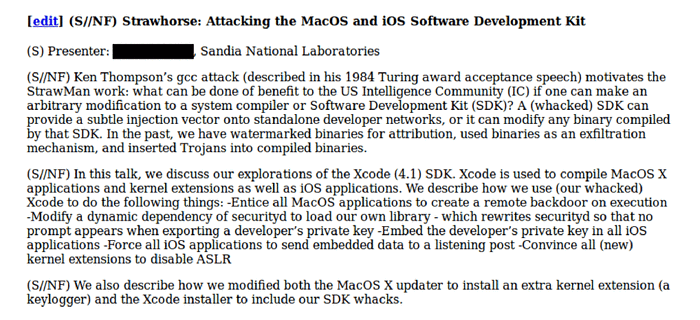
Leaked document from Edward Snowden. "Strawhorse: Attacking the MacOS and iOS Software Development Kit".

The attacker used a compiler backdoor attack. The novelty of this attack is the modification of the Xcode compiler. According to documents leaked by Edward Snowden, CIA security researchers from Sandia National Laboratories claimed that they "had created a modified version of Apple’s proprietary software development tool, Xcode, which could sneak surveillance backdoors into any apps or programs created using the tool."

==== Modified files ====
Known versions of XcodeGhost add extra files to the original Xcode application:

- Core service framework on iOS, iOS simulator and macOS platforms
- IDEBundleInjection framework added on iOS, iOS simulator and macOS platforms

XcodeGhost also modified the linker to link the malicious files into the compiled app. This step is reported on the compiling log but not on the Xcode IDE.

Both iOS and macOS apps are vulnerable to XcodeGhost.

==== Deployment ====
XcodeGhost compromised the CoreServices layer, which contains highly used features and frameworks used by the app. When a developer compiles their application with a compromised version of Xcode, the malicious CoreServices are automatically integrated into the app without the developer's knowledge.

Then the malicious files will add extra code in UIWindow class and UIDevice class. The UIWindow class is "an object that manages and coordinates the views an app displays on a device screen".

The UIDevice class provides a singleton instance representing the current device. From this instance the attacker can obtain information about the device such as assigned name, device model, and operating-system name and version.

=== Behavior on infected devices ===
==== Remote control security risks ====
XcodeGhost can be remotely controlled via commands sent by an attacker from a Command and control server through HTTP. This data is encrypted using the DES algorithm in ECB mode. Not only is this encryption mode known to be weak, the encryption keys can also be found using reverse engineering. An attacker could perform a man in the middle attack and transmit fake HTTP traffic to the device (to open a dialog box or open specific app for example).

==== Stealing user device information ====
When the infected app is launched, either by using an iPhone or the simulator inside Xcode, XcodeGhost will automatically collect device information such as:

- Current time
- Current infected app's name
- The app's bundle identifier
- Current device's name and type
- Current system's language and country
- Current device's UUID
- Network type

Then the malware will encrypt those data and send it to a command and control server. The server differs from version to version of XcodeGhost; Palo Alto Networks was able to find three server URLs:

- http://init.crash-analytics.com
- http://init.icloud-diagnostics.com
- http://init.icloud-analysis.com

The last domain was also used in the iOS malware KeyRaider.

==== Read and write from clipboard ====
XcodeGhost is also able, each time an infected app is launched, to store the data written in the iOS clipboard. The malware is also able to modify this data. This can be particularly dangerous if the user uses a password management app.

==== Hijack opening specific URLs ====
XcodeGhost is also able to open specific URLs when the infected app is launched. Since Apple iOS and macOS work with Inter-App Communication URL mechanism (e.g., 'whatsapp://', 'Facebook://', 'iTunes://'), the attacker can open any apps installed on the compromised phone or computer, in the case of an infected macOS application. Such a mechanism could be harmful to password management apps or even used to facilitate phishing attacks.

=== Infected apps ===
Among all the Chinese apps, IMs app, banking apps, mobile carrier's app, maps, stock trading apps, SNS apps and games were infected. Popular apps used all over the world were also infected such as WeChat, a popular instant messaging app, CamScanner, an app to scan document using the smartphone camera or WinZip.

Pangu Team claimed that they counted 3,418 infected apps.

Fox-it, a Netherlands-based security company, reports that it found thousands of malicious traffic sources outside China.

== Removal ==
=== Neutralizing command and control servers and compromised versions of Xcode ===
Since the article of Alibaba and Palo Alto Networks, Amazon took down all the servers that were used by XcodeGhost. Baidu also removed all malicious Xcode installers from its cloud storage service.

=== Removing malicious apps from the App Store ===
On September 18, 2015 Apple admitted the existence of the malware and began asking all developers with compromised apps to compile their apps with a clean version of Xcode before submitting them for review again.

Pangu Team released a tool to detect infected apps on a device, but like other antivirus apps, it will not run on a device that has not been jailbroken. Apple does not allow antivirus apps into the iOS App Store.

=== Checking Xcode version ===
Apple advises Xcode developers to verify their version of Xcode and to always have Gatekeeper activated on their machine.
