= WebObjects =

Java web application server and framework originally developed by NeXT Software

- WebObjects 5.2 packaging
- Original author: NeXT Software Inc.
- Developer: Apple Inc.
- Initial release: March 28, 1996; 30 years ago
- Final release: 5.4.3 / September 15, 2008; 17 years ago
- Written in: Java
- Operating system: OS X
- Successor: Project Wonder
- Type: Web application server
- License: Proprietary
- Website: www.apple.com/webobjects/

Project Wonder
- Developer: WebObjects Community Association
- Platform: Linux, macOS, Windows, and possibly others
- Available in: Java
- License: BSD-like
- Website: wiki.wocommunity.org/xwiki/bin/view/WEB/Home/
- Repository: github.com/wocommunity

WebObjects is a discontinued Java web application server and a server-based web application framework originally developed by NeXT Software, Inc.

WebObject's hallmark features are its object-orientation, database connectivity, and prototyping tools. Applications created with WebObjects can be deployed as web sites, Java WebStart desktop applications, and/or standards-based web services.

The deployment runtime is pure Java, allowing developers to deploy WebObjects applications on platforms that support Java. One can use the included WebObjects Java SE application server or deploy on third-party Java EE application servers such as JBoss, Apache Tomcat, WebLogic Server or IBM WebSphere.

WebObjects was maintained by Apple until its official discontinuation in 2016. However, because Apple has stopped maintaining the software, it now is instead maintained by an online community of volunteers. This community calls it "Project Wonder".

== History ==
=== NeXT creates WebObjects ===
WebObjects was created by NeXT Software, Inc., first publicly demonstrated at the Object World conference in 1995 and released to the public in March 1996. The time and cost benefits of rapid, object-oriented development attracted major corporations to WebObjects in the early days of e-commerce, with clients including BBC News, Dell Computer, Disney, DreamWorks SKG, Fannie Mae, GE Capital, Merrill Lynch, and Motorola.

=== Apple acquires NeXT, and continues to maintain the software ===
Following NeXT's merger into Apple Inc. in 1997, WebObjects' public profile languished. Many early adopters later switched to alternative technologies, including Apple which had been the last remaining large client for the software, relying on it to power parts of its online Apple Store and the iTunes Store – which was WebObjects' highest-profile implementation at the time.

WebObjects was part of Apple's strategy of using software to drive hardware sales, and in 2000 the price was lowered from $50,000 (for the full deployment license) to $699. From May 2001, WebObjects was included with Mac OS X Server, and no longer required a license key for development or deployment.

WebObjects transitioned from a stand-alone product to be a part of Mac OS X with the release of version 5.3 in June 2005. The developer tools and frameworks, which previously sold for US$699, were bundled with Apple's Xcode IDE. Support for other platforms, such as Windows, was then discontinued. Apple said that it would further integrate WebObjects development tools with Xcode in future releases. This included a new EOModeler Plugin for Xcode. This strategy, however, was not pursued further.

In 2006, Apple announced the deprecation of Mac OS X's Cocoa-Java bridge with the release of Xcode 2.4 at the August 2006 Worldwide Developers Conference (WWDC), and with it all dependent features, including the entire suite of WebObjects developer applications: EOModeler, EOModeler Plugin, WebObjects Builder, WebServices Assistant, RuleEditor and WOALauncher. Apple had decided to concentrate its engineering resources on the runtime engine of WebObjects, leaving the future responsibility for developer applications with the open-source community. The main open-source alternative – the Eclipse IDE with the WOLips suite of plugins – had matured to such an extent that its capabilities had, in many areas, surpassed those of Apple's own tools, which had not seen significant updates for a number of years.

Apple promised to provide assistance to the community in its efforts to extend such tools and develop new ones. In a posting to the webobjects-dev mailing list, Daryl Lee from Apple's WebObjects team publicly disclosed the company's new strategy for WebObjects. It promised to "make WebObjects the best server-side runtime environment" by:

- Improving performance, manageability, and standards compliance
- Making WebObjects work well with Ant and the most popular IDEs, including Xcode and Eclipse
- Opening and making public all standards and formats that WebObjects depends upon

WebObjects 5.4, which shipped with Mac OS X Leopard in October 2007, removed the license key requirement for both development and deployment of WebObjects applications on all platforms. All methods for checking license limitations were then deprecated.

=== The end of WebObjects, and the beginning of Project Wonder ===
In 2009, Apple stopped issuing new releases of WebObjects outside Apple. The community decided to continue development with Project Wonder, an open-source framework which is built on top of the core WebObjects frameworks and which extends them. For example, Project Wonder has updated development tools and provides a REST framework that was not part of the original WebObjects package.

Though once included in the default installation of Mac OS X Server, WebObjects was no longer installed by default starting with Mac OS X Snow Leopard Server and shortly after, Apple ceased promoting or selling WebObjects. As of 2016, WebObjects is actively supported by its developer community, the "WOCommunity Association", by extending the core frameworks and providing fixes with Project Wonder. The organization last held a Worldwide WebObjects Developer Conference, WOWODC, in 2013.

In May 2016, Apple confirmed that WebObjects had been discontinued.

== Tools ==
As of 2016 most WebObjects architects and engineers are using the tools being developed by the WebObjects community. These tools run within the Eclipse IDE and are open-source. The WebObjects plug-ins for Eclipse are known as WOLips.

Building WebObjects frameworks and applications for deployment is typically achieved using the WOProject set of tools for Apache Ant or Apache Maven. These tools are distributed with WOLips.

== Core frameworks ==
A WebObjects application is essentially a server-side executable, created by combining prebuilt application framework objects with the developer's own custom code. WebObjects' frameworks can be broken down into three core parts:

- The WebObjects Framework (WOF) is at the highest level of the system. It is responsible for the application's user interface and state management. It uses a template-based approach to take that object graph and turn it into HTML, or other tag-based information display standards, such as XML or SMIL. It provides an environment where you can use and create reusable components. Components are chunks of presentation (HTML) and functionality (Java code) often with a parameter list to enhance reusability. WebObjects Builder is used to create the HTML-templates and creates the .wod-file linking, for instance, a Java String object to interface objects like an input field in a web form.
- The Enterprise Objects Framework (EOF) is, perhaps, the hallmark feature of WebObjects. EOF communicates with relational databases and turns database rows into an object graph. Using EOModeler the developer can create an abstraction of the database in the forms of Java objects. In order to access or insert information into the database the developer simply accesses the Java Enterprise Objects (EOs) from their business logic. After that EOF manages the Enterprise Objects and automatically creates the required SQL-code to commit the changes to the database.
- Java Foundation. Both Enterprise Objects and WebObjects rest on the aptly named Java Foundation classes. This framework contains the fundamental data structure implementations and utilities used throughout the rest of WebObjects. Examples include basic value and collection classes, such as arrays, dictionaries (objects that contain key-value pairs) and formatting classes. Java Foundation is similar to the Foundation framework contained in Apple's Cocoa API for macOS desktop applications, however Java Foundation is written in Pure Java as opposed to Cocoa's Objective-C (with its Java bridge runtime wrapper). Foundation classes are prefixed with the letters "NS" (a reference to their NeXTSTEP OS heritage). Since the transition of WebObjects to Java in 2000, the functionality of many of Apple's Java Foundation classes is replicated in Sun's own JDK. However, they persist largely for reasons of backwards-compatibility and developers are free to use whichever frameworks they prefer.

== Rules-Based Rapid Application Development (RBRAD) ==
WebObjects features a set of rapid development technologies that can automatically create a Web application without the need to write any Java code. Given a model file for a database, WebObjects will create an interface supporting nine common database tasks, including querying, editing and listing. Such applications are useful for prototyping or administering a database, perhaps to check relationships or to seed the database with data.

The user interface is generated dynamically, on-the-fly at runtime using a rules-based system – no code is generated. Consequently, one can modify an application's configuration at runtime (using an assistant program) without recompiling or relaunching the application.

Developers can utilize one of three different technologies, depending upon the type of interface they wish to employ:

- Direct To Web (D2W) allows developers to rapidly create an HTML-based Web application that accesses a database.
- Direct To Java Client allows developers to rapidly create a client desktop application using the Java Swing toolkit. An advantage of Java Client applications is that they can take advantage of the processing power of the client computer to perform operations such as sorting a list of items received from the server.
- Direct To Web Services allows developers to rapidly develop Web service-based applications that provide access to a data store.

=== Advantages of RBRAD ===
- Vastly decreased development and debugging time;
- Increased stability through the use of highly exercised code;
- By using the information contained in the data model file, applications will not violate database integrity. Normally you would have to write code to avoid such situations and handle errors generated by bad data;
- Fully utilizes the validation services provided by WebObjects and Enterprise Objects.

== Java compatibility ==
WebObjects is a 100% Java product with the following Java-based features:

- Deployment: Applications can be deployed on any operating system that has Java 1.3 or later. Many developers have successfully deployed on Windows and various Linux systems such as Red Hat Linux, Debian and SUSE. Applications can also be hosted on any Java EE compatible application server such as JBoss.
- Java EE integration: WebObjects applications can be packaged in a single directory (an exploded .war file) that make it easier to deploy to a Java EE servlet container.
- JDBC: Since WebObjects uses JDBC for database connectivity any DBMS that has a JDBC-driver can be used within WebObjects.
- Swing interface: WebObjects applications can be delivered to the user as a "Java Client application" or as a Java applet.

== Version history ==
WebObjects was originally released by NeXT Computer in March 1996, but was acquired by Apple Inc. with their acquisition of NeXT in December of that year.

1.0 – March 28, 1996
- Debut release.
2.0 – June 25, 1996
- Pre-release version of WebObjects Builder application.
3.0 – November 1996
3.1
- Supports a subset of the Java APIs (NT only).
3.5 – December 1997
- Enhanced Java support (NT only): all objects and components can be worked on as a set of Java APIs based on a complete implementation of the JDK 1.1.3.
4.0 – September 1998
- First version of WebObjects to run on the Mac platform – specifically Mac OS X Server 1.0 (a public release of the beta OS formerly code-named 'Rhapsody').
- OPENSTEP 4.2 OS no longer supported; Windows NT now uses a new version of the OpenStep base of libraries and binary support called Yellow Box.
- Direct actions introduced whereby actions can be sent directly to an object that can handle it, allowing for simpler, static URLs.
- Direct to Web code-free development assistant introduced.
- WebObjects and Enterprise Objects Framework provide thread-safe APIs. This means that you can write a multithreaded WebObjects application where you could not before. This enables applications that can provide user feedback for long-running requests.
- Better tools for managing, configuring and testing the scalability of applications.
- Java capabilities are greatly improved over previous version, however compiled Objective-C is still two to three times faster;
- Possible to build a fully capable Java client either as a stand-alone app or as an applet with the Interface Builder - all sorts of Swing and Java Bean components are sitting on IB palettes for wiring up.
- Developers can now debug applications on a machine that doesn't have a web server present.
- EOF 3.0 adds support for a new database, OpenBase Lite, which ships with EOF 3.0 as an unsupported demo.
- EOF 3.0 introduces new API, mainly in EOUtilities, to facilitate common programming tasks.
- EOModeler adds support for prototype attributes and the ability to create and store complex queries (or EOFetchSpecifications).
4.5 – March 2000
- Integrated XML support using IBM's alphaWorks parser.
- New WebObjects Builder interface, specifically in the main window toolbar, the user interface for binding keys, and the table editing user interface. A path view, an API editor, and component validation have been added.
- Application profiling tools.
- EOF 4.5 comes with a new sample adaptor: the LDAP adaptor.
- Direct to Web now allows you to create your own visual style and exposes a great deal of new API.
- Java Client extended considerably, including a new user interface generation layer, Direct to Java Client.
4.5.1
- First version to support Mac OS X 10.x and Windows 2000.
- Last version to support HP-UX and Mac OS X Server 1.0.
- Last version that supported the Objective-C API.
5.0 – May 2001
- Major rewrite from Objective-C to Java.
5.1 – January 10, 2002
- Create and deploy Enterprise JavaBeans using the built-in container based on OpenEJB.
- Deploy WebObjects applications as JSPs or Servlets on top of third-party application servers.
- Access and manipulate data stored in JNDI or LDAP directory services.
- Automatically generate desktop Java client applications with rich, interactive user interfaces.
- Utilize the WebObjects template engine and object-relational mapping for seamless XML messaging.
5.1.2 – May 7, 2002
- Contains general bug fixes for WebObjects 5.1 on all platforms.
5.1.3 – June 7, 2002
- Contains targeted bug fixes for WebObjects 5.1 on all platforms.
5.1.4 – August 22, 2002
- Compatibility with Mac OS X 10.2.
5.2 – November 12, 2002
- Web Services support.
- Improvements to Java EE integration
- Java Web Start support.
- Improvements to robustness and stability of Enterprise Objects.
- Major bug fixes led many developers to hail this as the first stable 5.x release of WebObjects.
5.2.1 – March 21, 2003
- Resolved some incompatibilities with the latest Java 1.4.1 implementation for Mac OS X.
5.2.2 – October 22, 2003
- Compatibility with Mac OS X 10.3 Panther and the Xcode IDE.
- JBoss on Panther Server qualification.
- Qualified for Java 1.4.1.
- Fixes for EOF runtime and WOFileUpload.
5.2.3 – March 16, 2004
- Performance and stability update addressing issues with CLOSE_WAIT states in deployment using JavaMonitor and wotaskd and issues related to EOF under high load.
- Qualified for Java 1.4.2.
5.2.4 – May 2, 2005
- Compatibility with Mac OS X 10.4 and the Xcode 2.0 IDE.
5.3 (developer) for Mac OS X 10.4 – June 6, 2005
- WebObjects developer tools included free with the Xcode IDE (v2.1).
- Development and deployment on platforms other than Mac OS X no longer supported by Apple.
- EOModels can be created and edited within Xcode with a new EOModeler plugin that integrates with the CoreData modeling tools.
- WebObjects Builder has UI enhancements and generates HTML 4.0.1 code.
- WebObjects runtime now supports HTML 4.0.1.
- NSArray, NSDictionary and NSSet now implement the java.util.Collection interfaces.
- Axis 1.1 integrated with the Direct To WebServices feature.
- WebObjects is qualified against Oracle 10g using the 10.1.0.2 JDBC drivers; Microsoft SQL Server 2000 8.00.194; MySQL 4.1.10a; OpenBase 8.0; Oracle 9i Enterprise Edition Sybase ASE 12.5
5.3 (deployment) for Mac OS X Server 10.4 – June 23, 2005
- Installer updates the Application Server components in Mac OS X Server 10.4 to WebObjects 5.3.
5.3.1 – November 10, 2005
- Addresses incompatibilities with Xcode 2.2 Developer tools on Mac OS X 10.4.
- Adds a modified Developer tools license that allows WebObjects applications developed with Xcode 2.2 to be deployed on any compatible platform. The license is available at /System/Library/Frameworks/JavaWebObjects.framework/Resources/License.key after installation.
- Adds better SQL Generation in the EOModeler Plug-in design tool in Xcode.
- Improved FetchSpecification building in the EOModeler Plugin design tool in Xcode.
- Adds a "components and elements" window for improved workflow in WebObjects Builder.
- Bug fixes.
5.3.2 – August 7, 2006
- Addresses incompatibilities with Xcode 2.4 Developer tools on Mac OS X 10.4.
- Security improvements.
- Other improvements.
- As part of the simultaneous release of Xcode 2.4, the Cocoa Java bridge is deprecated along with the following WebObjects applications: EOModeler, EOModeler Plugin, WebObjects Builder, WebServices Assistant, RuleEditor and WOALauncher.
5.3.3 – February 15, 2007
- "WebObjects DST Update": Updates WebObjects 5.3 systems to observe the Daylight Saving Time (DST) changes due to come into effect in March 2007 in many countries, including the United States and Canada. Uses the latest DST and time zone information available as of January 8, 2007.
5.4 – October 26, 2007
- License key no longer required or supported
- Deprecations: Java Client Nib based applications, Direct to JavaClient based applications, EOCocoaClient based applications, OpenBase no longer example database, Tools (EOModeler, WebObjects Builder, Rule editor)
- Combined Component Template Parser that reduces .wo components to single .html files
- Generation of XHTML compliant pages
- AJAX request handler for enhanced page caching
- Added support for secure URL generation
- JMX monitoring support
- Entity index management in the model
- Improved the synchronization with the database
- Added support for index generation
- Support for enum in attribute conversion
- Improved support for vendor specific prototypes (EOJDBCOraclePrototype, EOJDBCFrontBasePrototype, etc.)
- Derby support (Embedded database)
- Support for Generics
- WebServices update (Axis 1.4)
- Full support for Apple XML plist (Read and Write)
- Ant build support
- Open Specifications
5.4.1 – February 11, 2008
- "WebObjects 5.4.1 is an update release for the version of WebObjects included in the Mac OS X Leopard tools. This release fixes several bugs in areas such as web services serialization, deployment tools, and database compatibility, among others. This update can be installed on Mac OS X 10.5 Leopard."
- Fixed bugs in web services serialization, deployment, databases.
5.4.2 – July 11, 2008
- Addresses WOComponent parser issues
- Includes WebServices data types and API changes
- Includes EOF SQL Generation fixes
- Resolves additional issues
5.4.3 – September 15, 2008
- EOF Database snapshot not updating
- Webassistant not available for D2W apps
- Exceptions when using WOTextField with formatters
- Duplicate primary keys generated by FrontBase JDBC Adaptor under load
- Additional issue fixes

== WOWODC ==
Since 2007, the community has held an annual conference for WebObjects developers, WOWODC. In 2007 and 2008, the conference was held the weekend before WWDC, and in 2009, the community promoted two conferences: WOWODC West in San Francisco on June 6 and 7, immediately before WWDC, and WOWODC East in Montreal on August 29 and 30. WOWODC 2010 was held in Montreal on August 27, 28 and 29, 2010. WOWODC 2011 was held in Montreal on July 1, 2 and 3 in 2011. WOWODC 2012 was held in Montreal on June 30, July 1 and 2, 2012. WOWODC 2013 was held in Montreal. WOWODC 2014 was held in Montreal (April 12, 13 and 14). WOWODC 2015 was held in Hamburg on April 25, 26 and 27. WOWODC 2016 was held in Montréal on June 24, 25 and 26

== Open-source alternatives ==
Interest in OpenSource alternatives to WebObjects that use the Objective-C language grew with WebObjects' move from Objective-C (last version WO 4.5.1) to Java (first version WO 5.0). The two frameworks available are SOPE, which has been used as the basis of the OpenGroupware.org groupware server for about eight years, and GNUstepWeb, which is part of the GNUstep project. Open-source rewrites of the EOF frameworks also exist (AJRDatabase, GDL2).

There are also Java-based alternatives:

- Wotonomy is a project, hosted on SourceForge, that implements a clean-room, open-source version of the WebObjects 5.x system. It provides a near-complete implementation of the MVC web-framework, as well as partial implementations of Foundation, Control, and Data layers, and other features. It is sufficiently functional for low-transaction volume, single-source database applications. While the project's structure was re-organized in 2006 around an Apache Maven build infrastructure and migrated to the Subversion revision control system, there has not been any substantial update to the codebase since 2003.
- Apache Tapestry has a design and philosophy similar to that of WebObjects. Tapestry is frequently combined with Apache Cayenne, a persistence framework inspired by EOF.
- GETobjects is another framework with an API similar to WebObjects 5.x that is related to SOPE.

An attempt to do a Swift version based on SOPE / GETobjects is available as SwiftObjects. The implementation for Swift 4 is limited due to the reflection capabilities of that Swift version.

== See also ==
- Comparison of application servers
- Comparison of web frameworks
