= Xcode =

IDE including tools for developing software for Apple platforms

- Developer: Apple
- Release: September 15, 2003; 23 years ago
- Stable release: 27.2 (27B52) (October 29, 2026; 21 days ago) [±]
- Preview release: 27.3 beta 2 (27C5035i) (November 16, 2026; 3 days ago) [±]
- Operating system: macOS
- Available in: English
- Type: Integrated development environment (IDE)
- License: Proprietary with open-source components
- Website: developer.apple.com/xcode

Xcode is a suite of developer tools for building apps on Apple devices. It includes an integrated development environment (IDE) of the same name for macOS, used to develop software for macOS, iOS, iPadOS, watchOS, tvOS, and visionOS. It was initially released in late 2003; the latest stable release is version 27, released on September 14, 2026, and is available free of charge via the Mac App Store and the Apple Developer website. Registered developers can also download preview releases and prior versions of the suite through the Apple Developer website. Xcode includes command-line tools that enable UNIX-style development via the Terminal app in macOS. They can also be downloaded and installed without the GUI.

Before Xcode, Apple offered developers Project Builder and Interface Builder to develop Mac OS X applications.

== Major features ==
Xcode supports source code for the programming languages: Swift, C++, Objective-C, Objective-C++, Java, AppleScript, Python, Ruby, ResEdit (Rez), and C, with a variety of programming models, including but not limited to Cocoa, Carbon, and Java. Third parties have added support for GNU Pascal, Free Pascal, Ada, C#, Go, Perl, and D.

Xcode can build fat binary (universal binary) files containing code for multiple architectures with the Mach-O executable format. These helped ease the transitions from 32-bit PowerPC to 64-bit PowerPC, from PowerPC to Intel x86, from 32-bit to 64-bit Intel, and most recently from Intel x86 to Apple silicon by allowing developers to distribute a single application to users and letting the operating system automatically choose the appropriate architecture at runtime. Using the iOS SDK, tvOS SDK, and watchOS SDK, Xcode can also be used to compile and debug applications for iOS, iPadOS, tvOS, and watchOS.

Xcode includes the GUI tool Instruments, which runs atop a dynamic tracing framework, DTrace, created by Sun Microsystems and released as part of OpenSolaris.

Xcode also integrates built-in support for source code management using the Git version control system and protocol, allowing the user to create and clone Git repositories (which can be hosted on source code repository hosting sites such as GitHub, Bitbucket, and Perforce, or self-hosted using open-source software such as GitLab), and to commit, push, and pull changes, all from within Xcode, automating tasks that would traditionally be performed by using Git from the command line.

=== Composition ===
The main application of the suite is the integrated development environment (IDE), also named Xcode. The Xcode suite includes most of Apple's developer documentation, and built-in Interface Builder, an application used to construct graphical user interfaces. Up to Xcode 4.1, the Xcode suite included a modified version of the GNU Compiler Collection. In Xcode 3.1 up to Xcode 4.6.3, it included the LLVM-GCC compiler, with front ends from the GNU Compiler Collection and a code generator based on LLVM. In Xcode 3.2 and later, it included the Clang C/C++/Objective-C compiler, with newly written front ends and a code generator based on LLVM, and the Clang static analyzer. Starting with Xcode 4.2, the Clang compiler became the default compiler, Starting with Xcode 5.0, Clang was the only compiler provided.

Up to Xcode 4.6.3, the Xcode suite used the GNU Debugger (GDB) as the back-end for the IDE's debugger. Starting with Xcode 4.3, the LLDB debugger was also provided; starting with Xcode 4.5 LLDB replaced GDB as the default back-end for the IDE's debugger. Starting with Xcode 5.0, GDB was no longer supplied.

=== Playgrounds ===
The Playgrounds feature of Xcode provides an environment for rapid experimentation and development in the Swift programming language. The original version of the feature was announced and released by Apple Inc on June 2, 2014, during WWDC 2014.

Playgrounds provide a testing ground that renders developer code in real time. They have the capability of evaluating and displaying the results of single expressions as they are coded (in line or on a side bar), providing rapid feedback to the programmer. This type of development environment, known as a read–eval–print loop (or REPL) is useful for learning, experimenting and fast prototyping. Playgrounds was used by Apple to publish Swift tutorials and guided tours where the REPL advantages are noticeable.

The Playgrounds feature was developed by the Developer Tools department at Apple. According to Chris Lattner, the inventor of Swift Programming Language and Senior Director and Architect at the Developer Tools Department, Playgrounds was "heavily influenced by Bret Victor's ideas, by Light Table and by many other interactive systems". Playgrounds was announced by Apple Inc. on June 2, 2014, during WWDC 2014 as part of Xcode 6 and released in September.

In September 2016, the Swift Playgrounds application for iPad (also available on macOS starting in February 2020) was released, incorporating these ideas into an educational tool. Xcode's Playgrounds feature continued development, with a new step-by-step execution feature introduced in Xcode 10 at WWDC 2018.

=== Removed features ===
Formerly, Xcode supported distributing a product build process over multiple systems. One technology involved was named Shared Workgroup Build, which used the Bonjour protocol to automatically discover systems providing compiler services, and a modified version of the free software product distcc to facilitate the distribution of workloads. Earlier versions of Xcode provided a system named Dedicated Network Builds. These features are absent in the supported versions of Xcode.

Xcode also includes Apple's WebObjects tools and frameworks for building Java web applications and web services (formerly sold as a separate product). As of Xcode 3.0, Apple dropped WebObjects development inside Xcode; WOLips should be used instead. Xcode 3 still includes the WebObjects frameworks.

== Version history ==
=== 1.x series ===
Xcode 1.0 was released in fall 2003. Xcode 1.0 was based on Project Builder, but had an updated user interface (UI), ZeroLink, Fix & Continue, distributed build support, and Code Sense indexing.

The next significant release, Xcode 1.5, had better code completion and an improved debugger.

=== 2.x series ===
Xcode 2.0 was released with Mac OS X v10.4 "Tiger". It included the Quartz Composer visual programming language, better Code Sense indexing for Java, and Ant support. It also included the Apple Reference Library tool, which allows searching and reading online documentation from Apple's website and documentation installed on a local computer.

Xcode 2.1 could create universal binary files. It supported shared precompiled headers, unit testing targets, conditional breakpoints, and watchpoints. It also had better dependency analysis.

The final version of Xcode for Mac OS X v10.4 was 2.5.

=== 3.x series ===
Xcode 3.0 was released with Mac OS X v10.5 "Leopard". Notable changes since 2.1 include the DTrace debugging tool (now named Instruments), refactoring support, context-sensitive documentation, and Objective-C 2.0 with garbage collection. It also supports Project Snapshots, which provide a basic form of version control; Message Bubbles, which show build errors debug values alongside code; and building four-architecture fat binaries (32 and 64-bit Intel and PowerPC).

Xcode 3.1 was an update release of the developer tools for Mac OS X, and was the same version included with the iPhone SDK. It could target non-Mac OS X platforms, including iPhone OS 2.0. It included the GCC 4.2 and LLVM GCC 4.2 compilers. Another new feature since Xcode 3.0 is that Xcode's SCM support now includes Subversion 1.5.

Xcode 3.2 was released with Mac OS X v10.6 "Snow Leopard" and installs on no earlier version of OS X. It supports static program analysis, among other features. It also drops official support for targeting versions earlier than iPhone OS 3.0. But it is still possible to target older versions, and the simulator supports iPhone OS 2.0 through 3.1. Also, Java support is "exiled" in 3.2 to the organizer.

Xcode 3.2.6 is the last version that can be downloaded for free for users of Mac OS X Snow Leopard (though it's not the last version that supports Snow Leopard; 4.2 is). Downloading Xcode 3.2.6 requires a free registration at Apple's developer site.

=== 4.x series ===
In June 2010, at the Apple Worldwide Developers Conference version 4 of Xcode was announced during the Developer Tools State of the Union address. Version 4 of the developer tools consolidates the Xcode editing tools and Interface Builder into one application, among other enhancements. Apple released the final version of Xcode 4.0 on March 9, 2011. The software was made available for free to all registered members of the $99 per year Mac Developer program and the $99 per year iOS Developer program. It was also sold for $4.99 to non-members on the Mac App Store (no longer available). Xcode 4.0 drops support for many older systems, including all PowerPC development and software development kits (SDKs) for Mac OS X 10.4 and 10.5, and all iOS SDKs older than 4.3. The deployment target can still be set to produce binaries for those older platforms, but for Mac OS platforms, one is then limited to creating x86 and x86-64 binaries. Later, Xcode was free to the general public. Before version 4.1, Xcode cost $4.99.

Xcode 4.1 was made available for free on July 20, 2011 (the day of Mac OS X Lion's release) to all users of Mac OS X Lion on the Mac App Store. On August 29, 2011, Xcode 4.1 was made available for Mac OS X Snow Leopard for members of the paid Mac or iOS developer programs. Xcode 4.1 was the last version to include GNU Compiler Collection (GCC) instead of only LLVM GCC or Clang.

On October 12, 2011, Xcode 4.2 was released concurrently with the release of iOS 5.0, and it included many more and improved features, such as storyboarding and automatic reference counting (ARC). Xcode 4.2 is the last version to support Mac OS X 10.6 "Snow Leopard", but is available only to registered developers with paid accounts; without a paid account, 3.2.6 is the latest download that appears for Snow Leopard.

Xcode 4.3, released on February 16, 2012, is distributed as one application bundle, Xcode.app, installed from the Mac App Store. Xcode 4.3 reorganizes the Xcode menu to include development tools. Xcode 4.3.1 was released on March 7, 2012, to add support for iOS 5.1. Xcode 4.3.2 was released on March 22, 2012, with enhancements to the iOS Simulator and a suggested move to the LLDB debugger versus the GDB debugger (which appear to be undocumented changes). Xcode 4.3.3, released in May 2012, featured an updated SDK for Mac OS X 10.7.4 "Lion" and a few bug fixes.

Xcode 4.4 was released on July 25, 2012. It runs on both Mac OS X Lion (10.7) and OS X Mountain Lion (10.8) and is the first version of Xcode to contain the OS X 10.8 "Mountain Lion" SDK. Xcode 4.4 includes support for automatic synthesizing of declared properties, new Objective-C features such as literal syntax and subscripting, improved localization, and more. On August 7, 2012, Xcode 4.4.1 was released with a few bug fixes.

On September 19, 2012, iOS 6 and Xcode 4.5 were released. Xcode added support for iOS 6 and the 4-inch Retina Display on iPhone 5 and iPod Touch 5th generation. It also brought some new Objective-C features to iOS, simplified localization, and added auto-layout support for iOS. On October 3, 2012, Xcode 4.5.1 was released with bug fixes and stability improvements. Less than a month later, Xcode 4.5.2 was released, with support for iPad Mini and iPad with Retina Display, and bug fixes and stability improvements.

On January 28, 2013, iOS 6.1 and Xcode 4.6 were released.

=== 5.x series ===
On June 10, 2013, at the Apple Worldwide Developers Conference, version 5 of Xcode was announced. On September 18, 2013, Xcode 5.0 was released. It shipped with iOS 7 and OS X 10.8 Mountain Lion SDKs. However, support for OS X 10.9 Mavericks was only available in beta versions. Xcode 5.0 also added a version of Clang generating 64-bit ARM code for iOS 7. Apple removed support for building garbage collected Cocoa binaries in Xcode 5.1.

=== 6.x series ===
On June 2, 2014, at the Worldwide Developers Conference, Apple announced version 6 of Xcode. One of the most notable features was support for Swift, an all-new programming language developed by Apple. Xcode 6 also included features like Playgrounds and live debugging tools. On September 17, 2014, at the same time, iOS 8 and Xcode 6 were released. Xcode could be downloaded on the Mac App Store.

=== 7.x series ===
On June 8, 2015, at the Apple Worldwide Developers Conference, Xcode version 7 was announced. It introduced support for Swift 2, and Metal for OS X, and added support for deploying on iOS devices without an Apple Developer account. Xcode 7 was released on September 16, 2015.

=== 8.x series ===
On June 13, 2016, at the Apple Worldwide Developers Conference, Xcode version 8 was announced; a beta version was released the same day. It introduced support for Swift 3. Xcode 8 was released on September 13, 2016.

=== 9.x series ===
On June 5, 2017, at the Apple Worldwide Developers Conference, Xcode version 9 was announced; a beta version was released the same day. It introduced support for Swift 4 and Metal 2. It also introduced remote debugging on iOS and tvOS devices wirelessly, through Wi-Fi.

Xcode 9 was publicly released on September 19, 2017.

=== 10.x series ===
On June 4, 2018, at the Apple Worldwide Developers Conference, Xcode version 10 was announced; a beta version was released the same day. Xcode 10 introduced support for the Dark Mode announced for macOS Mojave, the collaboration platforms Bitbucket and GitLab (in addition to already supported GitHub), training machine learning models from playgrounds, and the new features in Swift 4.2 and Metal 2.1, as well as improvements to the editor and the project build system. Xcode 10 also dropped support for building 32-bit macOS apps and no longer supports Subversion integration.

Xcode 10 was publicly released on September 17, 2018.

=== 11.x series ===
On June 3, 2019, at the Apple Worldwide Developers Conference, Xcode version 11 was announced; a beta version was released the same day. Xcode 11 introduced support for the new features in Swift 5.1, as well as the new SwiftUI framework (although the interactive UI tools are available only when running under macOS 10.15). It also supports building iPad applications that run under macOS; includes integrated support for the Swift Package Manager; and contains further improvements to the editor, including a "minimap" that gives an overview of a source code file with quick navigation. Xcode 11 requires macOS 10.14 or later and Xcode 11.4 requires 10.15 or later.

Xcode 11 was publicly released on September 20, 2019.

=== 12.x series ===
On June 22, 2020, at the Apple Worldwide Developers Conference, Xcode version 12 was announced; a beta version was released the same day. Xcode 12 introduced support for Swift 5.3 and requires macOS 10.15.4 or later. Xcode 12 dropped building apps for iOS 8 and the lowest version of iOS supported by Xcode 12 built apps is iOS 9. Xcode 12.1 also dropped support for building apps for Mac OS X 10.6 Snow Leopard. The minimum version of macOS supported by Xcode 12.1 built apps is OS X 10.9 Mavericks.

Xcode 12 was publicly released on September 16, 2020.

=== 13.x series ===
On June 7, 2021, at the Apple Worldwide Developers Conference, Xcode version 13 was announced; a beta version was released the same day. The new version introduced support for Swift 5.5 and requires macOS 11.3 or later. Xcode 13 contains SDKs for iOS / iPadOS 15, macOS 12, watchOS 8, and tvOS 15. Xcode 13's major features include the new concurrency model in Swift projects, improved support for version control providers (such as GitHub), including the ability to browse, view, and comment on pull requests right in the app interface, and support for Xcode Cloud, Apple's newly launched mobile CI/CD service (it also has a web version).

Xcode 13 was publicly released on September 20, 2021.

=== 14.x series ===
On June 6, 2022, at the Apple Worldwide Developers Conference, Xcode version 14 was announced; a beta version was released the same day. Xcode 14 dropped support for building 32-bit iOS apps. Xcode 14 dropped support for building apps for iOS 9 and 10 (these versions of iOS supported 32-bit iOS apps) and the minimum version of iOS supported by Xcode 14 built apps is iOS 11. Xcode 14 also dropped building apps for macOS 10.12 Sierra. The minimum version of macOS supported by Xcode 14 built apps is macOS 10.13 High Sierra.

Xcode 14 was publicly released on September 12, 2022.

=== 15.x series ===
On June 5, 2023, at the Apple Worldwide Developers Conference, Xcode version 15 was announced; a beta version was released the same day. Xcode 15 dropped support for building apps for iOS 11 and the minimum version of iOS supported by Xcode 15 built apps is iOS 12.

Xcode 15 was publicly released on September 18, 2023.

=== 16.x series ===
On June 10, 2024, at the Apple Worldwide Developers Conference, Xcode version 16 was announced; a beta version was released the same day. Xcode 16 introduced predictive code completion on Apple silicon Macs, along with the Swift Testing framework.

Xcode 16 was publicly released on September 16, 2024.

=== 26.x series ===
On June 9, 2025, at the Apple Worldwide Developers Conference, Xcode version 26 was announced; a beta version was released the same day. The version number change reflects a similar change done to unify version numbers across all of Apple's other platforms. Xcode 26 comes with automatic programming and chat query tools similar to GitHub Copilot, as well as AI-assisted actions accessible from anywhere in a codebase. These tools are powered using ChatGPT by default, but both local models and cloud models from other providers via API keys are supported.

Xcode 26 was publicly released on September 15, 2025.

=== 27.x series ===
On June 8, 2026, at the Apple Worldwide Developers Conference, Xcode version 27 was announced; a beta version was released the same day.

Xcode 27 was publicly released on September 14, 2026.

== Version comparison table ==
Discontinued	Current release	Beta

=== Xcode 1.0 - 2.x (before iOS support) ===
Version history
Version	Build	Release date	Runs on versions of Mac OS X	Mac OS X SDK(s)
1.0		September 28, 2003	Mac OS X Panther (10.3.x)	Mac OS X Cheetah (10.0.x), Mac OS X Puma (10.1.x), Mac OS X Jaguar (10.2.x), and Mac OS X Panther (10.3.x)
1.1		December 19, 2003	Mac OS X Panther (10.3.x)	Mac OS X Cheetah (10.0.x), Mac OS X Puma (10.1.x), Mac OS X Jaguar (10.2.x), and Mac OS X Panther (10.3.x)
1.2		April 22, 2004	Mac OS X Panther (10.3.x)	Mac OS X Cheetah (10.0.x), Mac OS X Puma (10.1.x), Mac OS X Jaguar (10.2.x), and Mac OS X Panther (10.3.x)
1.5		August 4, 2004	Mac OS X Panther (10.3.x)	Mac OS X Cheetah (10.0.x), Mac OS X Puma (10.1.x), Mac OS X Jaguar (10.2.x), and Mac OS X Panther (10.3.x)
2.0		April 29, 2005	Mac OS X Tiger (10.4.x)	Mac OS X Jaguar (10.2.x), Mac OS X Panther (10.3.x), and Mac OS X Tiger (10.4.x)
2.1		June 6, 2005	Mac OS X Tiger (10.4.x)	Mac OS X Jaguar (10.2.x), Mac OS X Panther (10.3.x), and Mac OS X Tiger (10.4.x)
2.2		November 10, 2005	Mac OS X Tiger (10.4.x)	Mac OS X Jaguar (10.2.x), Mac OS X Panther (10.3.x), and Mac OS X Tiger (10.4.x)
2.2.1		January 13, 2006	Mac OS X Tiger (10.4.x)	Mac OS X Jaguar (10.2.x), Mac OS X Panther (10.3.x), and Mac OS X Tiger (10.4.x)
2.3		May 23, 2006	Mac OS X Tiger (10.4.x)	Mac OS X Jaguar (10.2.x), Mac OS X Panther (10.3.x), and Mac OS X Tiger (10.4.x)
2.4		August 17, 2006	Mac OS X Tiger (10.4.x)	Mac OS X Jaguar (10.2.x), Mac OS X Panther (10.3.x), and Mac OS X Tiger (10.4.x)
2.4.1		October 31, 2006	Mac OS X Tiger (10.4.x)	Mac OS X Jaguar (10.2.x), Mac OS X Panther (10.3.x), and Mac OS X Tiger (10.4.x)
2.5		October 30, 2007	Mac OS X Tiger (10.4.x) and Mac OS X Leopard (10.5.x)	Mac OS X Jaguar (10.2.x), Mac OS X Panther (10.3.x), Mac OS X Tiger (10.4.x) and Mac OS X Leopard (10.5.x)
Version	Build	Release date	Runs on versions of Mac OS X	Mac OS X SDK(s)

=== Xcode 3.0 - 4.x ===
Version history
Version	Build	Release date	min OS X to run	OS X SDK(s)	iOS SDK(s) included	Min iOS Deployment Target	iOS arm supported	additional iOS Simulators
3.0		October 26, 2007	10.5.x	Mac OS X Panther (10.3.x), Mac OS X Tiger (10.4.x), and Mac OS X Leopard (10.5.x)	iOS 2.x + each down to iOS 2.0	iOS 2.0	armv6	-
3.1		August 2, 2008	10.5.x	Mac OS X Panther (10.3.x), Mac OS X Tiger (10.4.x), and Mac OS X Leopard (10.5.x)	iOS 2.x + each down to iOS 2.0	iOS 2.0	armv6	-
3.1.1		October 17, 2008	10.5.x	Mac OS X Panther (10.3.x), Mac OS X Tiger (10.4.x), and Mac OS X Leopard (10.5.x)	iOS 2.x + each down to iOS 2.0	iOS 2.0	armv6	-
3.1.2		November 23, 2008	10.5.x	Mac OS X Panther (10.3.x), Mac OS X Tiger (10.4.x), and Mac OS X Leopard (10.5.x)	iOS 2.x + each down to iOS 2.0	iOS 2.0	armv6	-
3.1.3		June 17, 2009	10.5.7	Mac OS X Panther (10.3.x), Mac OS X Tiger (10.4.x), and Mac OS X Leopard (10.5.x)	iOS 3.1.3 (7E18) or lower + each down to iOS 2.0	iOS 2.0	armv6 + for iOS 3.x: armv7	-
3.1.4	1203	July 15, 2009	10.5.7	Mac OS X Panther (10.3.x), Mac OS X Tiger (10.4.x), and Mac OS X Leopard (10.5.x)	iOS 3.1.3 (7E18) or lower + each down to iOS 2.0	iOS 2.0	armv6 + for iOS 3.x: armv7	-
3.2		August 28, 2009	10.6.0	Mac OS X Tiger (10.4.x), Mac OS X Leopard (10.5.x), and Mac OS X Snow Leopard (10.6.x)	iOS 3.1.3 (7E18) or lower + each down to iOS 2.0	iOS 2.0	armv6 + for iOS 3.x: armv7	-
3.2.1		October 9, 2009	10.6.0	Mac OS X Tiger (10.4.x), Mac OS X Leopard (10.5.x), and Mac OS X Snow Leopard (10.6.x)	iOS 3.1.3 (7E18) or lower + each down to iOS 2.0	iOS 2.0	armv6 + for iOS 3.x: armv7	-
3.2.2	1650	April 3, 2010	10.6.2	Mac OS X Tiger (10.4.x), Mac OS X Leopard (10.5.x), and Mac OS X Snow Leopard (10.6.x)	iOS 3.2 (7B367) + each down to iOS 3.0	iOS 3.0	armv6, armv7	-
3.2.3		June 22, 2010	10.6.4	Mac OS X Tiger (10.4.x), Mac OS X Leopard (10.5.x), and Mac OS X Snow Leopard (10.6.x)	iOS 4.0.x + iOS 3.2	iOS 3.0	armv6, armv7	-
3.2.4		September 8, 2010	10.6.4	Mac OS X Tiger (10.4.x), Mac OS X Leopard (10.5.x), and Mac OS X Snow Leopard (10.6.x)	iOS 4.1 + iOS 3.2	iOS 3.0	armv6, armv7	iOS 4.0.2 (8A400)
3.2.5	1760	October 14, 2010	10.6.4	Mac OS X Tiger (10.4.x), Mac OS X Leopard (10.5.x), and Mac OS X Snow Leopard (10.6.x)	iOS 4.2 (8C134)	iOS 3.0	armv6, armv7	iOS 4.1 (8B117) + iOS 4.0.2 (8A400) + iOS 3.2 (7W367a)
3.2.6	1761	February 14, 2011	10.6.6	Mac OS X Tiger (10.4.x), Mac OS X Leopard (10.5.x), and Mac OS X Snow Leopard (10.6.x)	iOS 4.3 (8F190)	iOS 3.0	armv6, armv7	iOS 4.2 (8C134) + iOS 4.1 (8B117) + iOS 4.0.2 (8A400) + iOS 3.2 (7W367a)
4.0	4A304a	March 14, 2011	10.6.6	Mac OS X Snow Leopard (10.6.x)	iOS 4.3 (8F190)	iOS 3.0	armv6, armv7	iOS 4.2 (8C134) + iOS 4.1 (8B117) + iOS 4.0.2 (8A400) + iOS 3.2 (7W367a)
4.0.1	4A1006	March 25, 2011	10.6.6	Mac OS X Snow Leopard (10.6.x)	iOS 4.3 (8F190)	iOS 3.0	armv6, armv7	iOS 4.2 (8C134) + iOS 4.1 (8B117) + iOS 4.0.2 (8A400) + iOS 3.2 (7W367a)
4.0.2	4A2002a	April 14, 2011	10.6.6	Mac OS X Snow Leopard (10.6.x)	iOS 4.3.2 (8H7)	iOS 3.0	armv6, armv7	iOS 4.2 (8C134) + iOS 4.1 (8B117) + iOS 4.0.2 (8A400) + iOS 3.2 (7W367a)
4.1	4B110 (10.7) 4B110f (10.6)	July 20, 2011	10.6.7 and 10.7	Mac OS X Snow Leopard (10.6.x) and Mac OS X Lion (10.7.x)	iOS 4.3.2 (8H7)	iOS 3.0	armv6, armv7	-
4.1.1		August 4, 2011	10.6.7 and 10.7	Mac OS X Snow Leopard (10.6.x) and Mac OS X Lion (10.7.x)	iOS 4.3.2 (8H7)	iOS 3.0	armv6, armv7	-
4.2	4D199 (10.7) 4C199 (10.6)	October 12, 2011	10.6.7 and 10.7	Mac OS X Snow Leopard (10.6.x) and Mac OS X Lion (10.7.x)	iOS 5.0 (9A334)	iOS 3.0	armv6, armv7	downloadable: iOS 4.3.2 (8H7)
4.2.1	4D502	November 18, 2011	10.7	Mac OS X Snow Leopard (10.6.x) and Mac OS X Lion (10.7.x)	iOS 5.0 (9A334)	iOS 3.0	armv6, armv7	downloadable: iOS 4.3.2 (8H7)
4.3	4E109	February 16, 2012	10.7.3	Mac OS X Snow Leopard (10.6.x) and Mac OS X Lion (10.7.x)	iOS 5.0 (9A334)	iOS 3.0	armv6, armv7	downloadable: iOS 4.3.2 (8H7)
4.3.1	4E1019	March 7, 2012	10.7.3	Mac OS X Snow Leopard (10.6.x) and Mac OS X Lion (10.7.x)	iOS 5.1 (9B176)	iOS 3.0	armv6, armv7	downloadable: iOS 5.0 + only for OS X 10.7: iOS 4.3
4.3.2	4E2002	March 22, 2012	10.7.3	Mac OS X Snow Leopard (10.6.x) and Mac OS X Lion (10.7.x)	iOS 5.1 (9B176)	iOS 3.0	armv6, armv7	downloadable: iOS 5.0 + only for OS X 10.7: iOS 4.3
4.3.3	4E3002	May 9, 2012	10.7.3	Mac OS X Snow Leopard (10.6.x) and Mac OS X Lion (10.7.x)	iOS 5.1 (9B176)	iOS 3.0	armv6, armv7	downloadable: iOS 5.0 + only for OS X 10.7: iOS 4.3
4.4		July 25, 2012	10.7.4	Mac OS X Lion (10.7.x) and OS X Mountain Lion (10.8.x)	iOS 5.1 (9B176)	iOS 3.0	armv6, armv7	downloadable: iOS 5.0 + only for OS X 10.7: iOS 4.3
4.4.1	4F1003	August 7, 2012	10.7.4	Mac OS X Lion (10.7.x) and OS X Mountain Lion (10.8.x)	iOS 5.1 (9B176)	iOS 3.0	armv6, armv7	downloadable: iOS 5.0 + only for OS X 10.7: iOS 4.3
4.5		September 19, 2012	10.7.4	Mac OS X Lion (10.7.x) and OS X Mountain Lion (10.8.x)	iOS 6.0 (10A403)	iOS 4.3	armv7, armv7s	downloadable: iOS 5.1 + iOS 5.0 + only for OS X 10.7: iOS 4.3
4.5.1		October 3, 2012	10.7.4	Mac OS X Lion (10.7.x) and OS X Mountain Lion (10.8.x)	iOS 6.0 (10A403)	iOS 4.3	armv7, armv7s	downloadable: iOS 5.1 + iOS 5.0 + only for OS X 10.7: iOS 4.3
4.5.2	4G2008	November 1, 2012	10.7.4	Mac OS X Lion (10.7.x) and OS X Mountain Lion (10.8.x)	iOS 6.0 (10A403)	iOS 4.3	armv7, armv7s	downloadable: iOS 5.1 + iOS 5.0 + only for OS X 10.7: iOS 4.3
4.6	4H127	Feb 20, 2013	10.7.4	Mac OS X Lion (10.7.x) and OS X Mountain Lion (10.8.x)	iOS 6.1 (10B141)	iOS 4.3	armv7, armv7s	downloadable: iOS 6.0 + iOS 5.1 + iOS 5.0 + only for OS X 10.7: iOS 4.3
4.6.1	4H512	March 14, 2013	10.7.4	Mac OS X Lion (10.7.x) and OS X Mountain Lion (10.8.x)	iOS 6.1 (10B141)	iOS 4.3	armv7, armv7s	downloadable: iOS 6.0 + iOS 5.1 + iOS 5.0 + only for OS X 10.7: iOS 4.3
4.6.2	4H1003	April 15, 2013	10.7.4	Mac OS X Lion (10.7.x) and OS X Mountain Lion (10.8.x)	iOS 6.1 (10B141)	iOS 4.3	armv7, armv7s	downloadable: iOS 6.0 + iOS 5.1 + iOS 5.0 + only for OS X 10.7: iOS 4.3
4.6.3	4H1503	June 14, 2013	10.7.4	Mac OS X Lion (10.7.x) and OS X Mountain Lion (10.8.x)	iOS 6.1 (10B141)	iOS 4.3	armv7, armv7s	downloadable: iOS 6.0 + iOS 5.1 + iOS 5.0 + only for OS X 10.7: iOS 4.3
Version	Build	Release date	min OS X to run	OS X SDK(s)	iOS SDK(s) included	Min iOS Deployment Target	iOS arm supported	additional iOS Simulators

=== Xcode 5.0 - 6.x (since arm64 support) ===
Version history
Version	Build	Release date	min OS X to run	OS X SDK(s)	iOS SDK(s) included	Min iOS Deployment Target	iOS arm supported	downloadable iOS Simulators
5.0	5A1413	September 18, 2013	10.8.4	OS X v10.8	iOS 7.0 (11A465)	iOS 4.3 or iOS 6.0 (for arch with arm64)	armv7, armv7s, arm64	iOS 6.1 + iOS 6.0 + only for OS X 10.8: iOS 5.1 + iOS 5.0
5.0.1	5A2053	October 22, 2013	10.8.4	OS X v10.8 + OS X v10.9	iOS 7.0.3 (11B508)	iOS 4.3 or iOS 5.1.1 (for arch with arm64)	armv7, armv7s, arm64	iOS 6.1 + iOS 6.0 + only for OS X 10.8: iOS 5.1 + iOS 5.0
5.0.2	5A3005	November 12, 2013	10.8.4	OS X v10.8 + OS X v10.9	iOS 7.0.3 (11B508)	iOS 4.3 or iOS 5.1.1 (for arch with arm64)	armv7, armv7s, arm64	iOS 6.1 + iOS 6.0 + only for OS X 10.8: iOS 5.1 + iOS 5.0
5.1	5B130a	March 10, 2014	10.8.4	OS X v10.8 + OS X v10.9	iOS 7.1 (11D167)	iOS 4.3 or iOS 5.1.1 (for arch with arm64)	armv7, armv7s, arm64	iOS 7.0 + iOS 6.1
5.1.1	5B1008	April 10, 2014	10.8.4	OS X v10.8 + OS X v10.9	iOS 7.1 (11D167)	iOS 4.3 or iOS 5.1.1 (for arch with arm64)	armv7, armv7s, arm64	iOS 6.1
6.0.1	6A317	September 17, 2014	10.9.4	OS X v10.9	iOS 8.0 (12A365)	iOS 4.3 or iOS 5.1.1 (for arch with arm64)	Default: armv7, arm64 Manually: armv7s	iOS 7.1 + only for OS X 10.9 iOS 7.0
6.1	6A1052c 6A1052d	October 16, 2014 October 20, 2014	10.9.4	OS X v10.9 + OS X v10.10	iOS 8.1 (12B411)	iOS 4.3 or iOS 5.1.1 (for arch with arm64)	Default: armv7, arm64 Manually: armv7s	iOS 7.1 + only for OS X 10.9 iOS 7.0
6.1.1	6A2008a	December 2, 2014	10.9.4	OS X v10.9 + OS X v10.10	iOS 8.1 (12B411)	iOS 4.3 or iOS 5.1.1 (for arch with arm64)	Default: armv7, arm64 Manually: armv7s	iOS 7.1 + only for OS X 10.9 iOS 7.0
6.2	6C131e	March 9, 2015	10.9.4	OS X v10.9 + OS X v10.10	iOS 8.2 (12D508)	iOS 4.3 or iOS 5.1.1 (for arch with arm64)	Default: armv7, arm64 Manually: armv7s	iOS 8.1 + iOS 7.1
6.3	6D570	April 8, 2015	10.10	OS X v10.9 + OS X v10.10	iOS 8.3 (12F69)	iOS 4.3 or iOS 5.1.1 (for arch with arm64)	Default: armv7, arm64 Manually: armv7s	iOS 8.2 + iOS 8.1 + iOS 7.1
6.3.1	6D1002	April 21, 2015	10.10	OS X v10.9 + OS X v10.10	iOS 8.3 (12F69)	iOS 4.3 or iOS 5.1.1 (for arch with arm64)	Default: armv7, arm64 Manually: armv7s	iOS 8.2 + iOS 8.1 + iOS 7.1
6.3.2	6D2105	May 18, 2015	10.10	OS X v10.9 + OS X v10.10	iOS 8.3 (12F69)	iOS 4.3 or iOS 5.1.1 (for arch with arm64)	Default: armv7, arm64 Manually: armv7s	iOS 8.2 + iOS 8.1 + iOS 7.1
6.4	6E35b	June 30, 2015	10.10	OS X v10.9 + OS X v10.10	iOS 8.4 (12H141)	iOS 4.3 or iOS 5.1.1 (for arch with arm64)	Default: armv7, arm64 Manually: armv7s	iOS 8.3 + iOS 8.2 + iOS 8.1 + iOS 7.1
Version	Build	Release date	min OS X to run	OS X SDK(s)	iOS SDK(s) included	Min iOS Deployment Target	iOS arm supported	downloadable iOS Simulators

=== Xcode 7.0 - 10.x (since Free On-Device Development) ===
Version history
Version	Build	Release date	min macOS to run	macOS SDK(s)	iOS SDK included	watchOS SDK included	tvOS SDK included	Downloadable simulators	Notes
7.0	7A220	September 16, 2015	10.10.4	10.11 (15A278)	iOS 9 (13A340)	watchOS 2 (13S343)	-	iOS 8.4 + iOS 8.3 + iOS 8.2 + iOS 8.1	
7.0.1	7A1001	September 28, 2015	10.10.4	10.11 (15A278)	iOS 9 (13A340)	watchOS 2 (13S343)	-	iOS 8.4 + iOS 8.3 + iOS 8.2 + iOS 8.1	
7.1	7B91b	October 21, 2015	10.10.5	10.11 (15A278)	iOS 9.1 (13B137)	watchOS 2 (13S343)	tvOS 9.0 (13T393)	added iOS 9.0	
7.1.1	7B1005	November 9, 2015	10.10.5	10.11 (15A278)	iOS 9.1 (13B137)	watchOS 2 (13S343)	tvOS 9.0 (13T393)	added iOS 9.0	
7.2	7C68	December 8, 2015	10.10.5	10.11.2 (15C43)	iOS 9.2 (13C75)	watchOS 2.1 (13S660)	tvOS 9.1 (13U78)	added iOS 9.1 + tvOS 9.0 + watchOS 2.0	
7.2.1	7C1002	February 3, 2016	10.10.5	10.11.2 (15C43)	iOS 9.2 (13C75)	watchOS 2.1 (13S660)	tvOS 9.1 (13U79)	added iOS 9.1 + tvOS 9.0 + watchOS 2.0	
7.3	7D175	March 21, 2016	10.11	10.11.4 (15E60)	iOS 9.3 (13E230)	watchOS 2.2 (13V143)	tvOS 9.2 (13Y227)	added iOS 9.2 + tvOS 9.1 + watchOS 2.1	
7.3.1	7D1012 7D1014	May 3, 2016	10.11	10.11.4 (15E60)	iOS 9.3 (13E230)	watchOS 2.2 (13V143)	tvOS 9.2 (13Y227)	added iOS 9.2 + tvOS 9.1 + watchOS 2.1	
8.0	8A218a	September 13, 2016	10.11.5	10.12 (16A300)	iOS 10 (14A345)	watchOS 3 (14S326)	tvOS 10.0 (14T328)	added iOS 9.3 + tvOS 9.2 + watchOS 2.2	
8.1	8B62	October 27, 2016	10.11.5	10.12.1 (16B2649)	iOS 10.1 (14B72)	watchOS 3.1 (14S471a)	tvOS 10.0 (14T328)	added iOS 10.0 (there is no watchOS 3.0)	
8.2	8C38	December 12, 2016	10.11.5	10.12.2 (16C58)	iOS 10.2 (14C89)	watchOS 3.1 (14S471a)	tvOS 10.1 (14U591)	added iOS 10.1 + tvOS 10.0	
8.2.1	8C1002	December 19, 2016	10.11.5	10.12.2 (16C58)	iOS 10.2 (14C89)	watchOS 3.1 (14S471a)	tvOS 10.1 (14U591)	added iOS 10.1 + tvOS 10.0	
8.3	8E162	March 27, 2017	10.12	10.12.4 (16E185)	iOS 10.3 (14E269)	watchOS 3.2 (14V243)	tvOS 10.2 (14W260)	added iOS 10.2 + tvOS 10.1 (there is no watchOS 3.1)	
8.3.1	8E1000a	April 6, 2017	10.12	10.12.4 (16E185)	iOS 10.3 (14E269)	watchOS 3.2 (14V243)	tvOS 10.2 (14W260)	added iOS 10.2 + tvOS 10.1 (there is no watchOS 3.1)	
8.3.2	8E2002	April 18, 2017	10.12	10.12.4 (16E185)	iOS 10.3 (14E269)	watchOS 3.2 (14V243)	tvOS 10.2 (14W260)	added iOS 10.2 + tvOS 10.1 (there is no watchOS 3.1)	
8.3.3	8E3004b	June 5, 2017	10.12	10.12.4 (16E185)	iOS 10.3.1 (14E8301)	watchOS 3.2 (14V243)	tvOS 10.2 (14W260)	added watchOS 3.1 Simulator	(Note: Unable to run since MacOS 10.14)
9.0	9A235	September 19, 2017	10.12.6	10.13 (17A360)	iOS 11.0 (15A372)	watchOS 4.0 (15R372)	tvOS 11.0 (15J380)	added iOS 10.3.1 + tvOS 10.2 + watchOS 3.2	
9.0.1	9A1004	October 15, 2017	10.12.6	10.13 (17A360)	iOS 11.0 (15A372)	watchOS 4.0 (15R372)	tvOS 11.0 (15J380)	added iOS 10.3.1 + tvOS 10.2 + watchOS 3.2	
9.1	9B55	October 31, 2017	10.12.6	10.13.1 (17B48)	iOS 11.1 (15B93/15B101)	watchOS 4.1 (15R846)	tvOS 11.1 (15J582)	added iOS 11.0 + tvOS 11 + watchOS 4.0	
9.2	9C40b	December 4, 2017	10.12.6	10.13.2 (17C76)	iOS 11.2 (15C107)	watchOS 4.2 (15S100)	tvOS 11.2 (15K104)	added iOS 11.1 + tvOS 11.1 + watchOS 4.1	
9.3	9E145	March 29, 2018	10.13.2	10.13.4 (17E189)	iOS 11.3 (15E217)	watchOS 4.3 (15T212)	tvOS 11.3 (15L211)	added iOS 11.2 + tvOS 11.2 + watchOS 4.2	
9.3.1	9E501	May 9, 2018	10.13.2	10.13.4 (17E189)	iOS 11.3 (15E217)	watchOS 4.3 (15T212)	tvOS 11.3 (15L211)	added iOS 11.2 + tvOS 11.2 + watchOS 4.2	
9.4	9F1027a	May 29, 2018	10.13.2	10.13.4 (17E189)	iOS 11.4 (15F79)	watchOS 4.3 (15T212)	tvOS 11.4 (15L576)	added iOS 11.3 + tvOS 11.3	
9.4.1	9F2000	June 13, 2018	10.13.2	10.13.4 (17E189)	iOS 11.4 (15F79)	watchOS 4.3 (15T212)	tvOS 11.4 (15L576)	added iOS 11.3 + tvOS 11.3	
10.0	10A255	September 17, 2018	10.13.6	10.14 (18A384)	iOS 12.0 (16A366)	watchOS 5.0 (16R363)	tvOS 12.0 (16J364)	added iOS 11.4 + tvOS 11.4 + watchOS 4.3	
10.1	10B61	October 30, 2018	10.13.6	10.14.1 (18B71)	iOS 12.1 (16B91)	watchOS 5.1 (16R591)	tvOS 12.1 (16J602)	added iOS 12.0 + tvOS 12.0 + watchOS 5.0	
10.2	10E125	Mar 25, 2019	10.14.3	10.14.4 (18E219)	iOS 12.2 (16E226)	watchOS 5.2 (16T224)	tvOS 12.2 (16L225)	added iOS 12.1 + tvOS 12.1 + watchOS 5.1	
10.2.1	10E1001	Apr 17, 2019	10.14.3	10.14.4 (18E219)	iOS 12.2 (16E226)	watchOS 5.2 (16T224)	tvOS 12.2 (16L225)	added iOS 12.1 + tvOS 12.1 + watchOS 5.1	
10.3	10G8	July 22, 2019	10.14.3	10.14.6 (18G74)	iOS 12.4 (16G73)	watchOS 5.3 (16U567)	tvOS 12.4 (16M567)	added iOS 12.2 + tvOS 12.2 + watchOS 5.2	
Version	Build	Release date	min macOS to run	macOS SDK(s)	iOS SDK included	watchOS SDK included	tvOS SDK included	Downloadable simulators	Notes

=== Xcode 11.0 - 14.x (since SwiftUI framework) ===
Version history
Version	Build	Release date	min macOS to run	macOS SDK(s)	iOS SDK included	watchOS SDK included	tvOS SDK included	Notes
11.0	11A420a	September 20, 2019	10.14.4	10.15 (19A547)	iOS 13.0 (17A566)	watchOS 6.0 (17R566)	tvOS 13.0 (17J559)	(Note: To see the SwiftUI preview, you need macOS 10.15)
11.1	11A1027	October 7, 2019	10.14.4	10.15 (19A547)	iOS 13.1 (17A820)	watchOS 6.0 (17R566)	tvOS 13.0 (17J559)	
11.2	11B52	October 31, 2019	10.14.4	10.15.1 (19B81)	iOS 13.2 (17B80)	watchOS 6.1 (17S80)	tvOS 13.2 (17K81)	
11.2.1	11B500	November 12, 2019	10.14.4	10.15.1 (19B89)	iOS 13.2 (17B102)	watchOS 6.1 (17S80)	tvOS 13.2 (17K90)	
11.3	11C29	December 10, 2019	10.14.4	10.15.2 (19B90)	iOS 13.2 (17B102)	watchOS 6.1 (17S80)	tvOS 13.2 (17K90)	
11.3.1	11C505	January 13, 2020	10.14.4	10.15.2 (19B90)	iOS 13.2 (17B102)	watchOS 6.1 (17S80)	tvOS 13.2 (17K90)	
11.4	11E146	March 24, 2020	10.15.2	10.15.4 (19E258)	iOS 13.4 (17E255)	watchOS 6.2 (17T255)	tvOS 13.4 (17L255)	
11.4.1	11E503a	April 15, 2020	10.15.2	10.15.4 (19E258)	iOS 13.4 (17E8258)	watchOS 6.2 (17T255)	tvOS 13.4 (17L255)	
11.5	11E608c	May 20, 2020	10.15.2	10.15.4 (19E258)	iOS 13.5 (17F65)	watchOS 6.2 (17T255)	tvOS 13.4 (17L255)	
11.6	11E708	July 15, 2020	10.15.2	10.15.6 (19G68)	iOS 13.6 (17G64)	watchOS 6.2 (17T255)	tvOS 13.4 (17L255)	
11.7	11E801a	September 1, 2020	10.15.2	10.15.6 (19G68)	iOS 13.7 (17H22)	watchOS 6.2 (17T255)	tvOS 13.4 (17L255)	
12.0	12A7209	September 16, 2020	10.15.4 (Intel-based Mac); 11.0 (Apple silicon Mac)	10.15.6 (19G68)	iOS 14 (18A390)	watchOS 7 (18R382)	tvOS 14 (18J390)	
12.0.1	12A7300	September 24, 2020	10.15.4 (Intel-based Mac); 11.0 (Apple silicon Mac)	10.15.6 (19G68)	iOS 14 (18A390)	watchOS 7 (18R382)	tvOS 14 (18J390)	
12.1	12A7403	October 20, 2020	10.15.4 (Intel-based Mac); 11.0 (Apple silicon Mac)	10.15.6 (19G68)	iOS 14.1 (18A8394)	watchOS 7 (18R382)	tvOS 14 (18J390)	
12.1.1 RC	12A7605b	October 30, 2020	10.15.4 (Intel-based Mac); 11.0 (Apple silicon Mac)	10.15.6 (19G68)	iOS 14.2 (18B79)	watchOS 7.1 (18R579)	tvOS 14.2 (18K54)	
12.2	12B45b	November 12, 2020	10.15.4 (Intel-based Mac); 11.0 (Apple silicon Mac)	11.0 (20A2408)	iOS 14.2 (18B79)	watchOS 7.1 (18R579)	tvOS 14.2 (18K54)	
12.3	12C33	December 14, 2020	10.15.4 (Intel-based Mac); 11.0 (Apple silicon Mac)	11.1 (20C63)	iOS 14.3 (18C61)	watchOS 7.2 (18S561)	tvOS 14.3 (18K559)	
12.4	12D4e	January 26, 2021	10.15.4 (Intel-based Mac); 11.0 (Apple silicon Mac)	11.1 (20C63)	iOS 14.4 (18D46)	watchOS 7.2 (18S561)	tvOS 14.3 (18K559)	
12.5	12E262	April 26, 2021	11.0	11.3 (20E214)	iOS 14.5 (18E182)	watchOS 7.4 (18T187)	tvOS 14.5 (18L191)	
12.5.1	12E507	June 21, 2021	11.0	11.3 (20E214)	iOS 14.5 (18E182)	watchOS 7.4 (18T187)	tvOS 14.5 (18L191)	
13.0	13A233	September 20, 2021	11.3	11.3 (20E214)	iOS 15.0 (19A339)	watchOS 8.0 (19R341)	tvOS 15.0 (19J344)	
13.1	13A1030d	October 25, 2021	11.3	12.0 (21A344)	iOS 15.0 (19A339)	watchOS 8.0.1 (19R351)	tvOS 15.0 (19J344)	
13.2	13C90	December 13, 2021	11.3	12.1 (21C46)	iOS 15.2 (19C51)	watchOS 8.3 (19S51)	tvOS 15.2 (19K50)	
13.2.1	13C100	December 17, 2021	11.3	12.1 (21C46)	iOS 15.2 (19C51)	watchOS 8.3 (19S51)	tvOS 15.2 (19K50)	
13.3	13E113	March 14, 2022	12.0	12.3 (21E226)	iOS 15.4 (19E239)	watchOS 8.5 (19T241)	tvOS 15.4 (19L439)	
13.3.1	13E500a	April 11, 2022	12.0	12.3 (21E226)	iOS 15.4 (19E239)	watchOS 8.5 (19T241)	tvOS 15.4 (19L439)	
13.4	13F17a	May 16, 2022	12.0	12.3 (21E226)	iOS 15.5 (19F64)	watchOS 8.5 (19T241)	tvOS 15.4 (19L439)	
13.4.1	13F100	June 2, 2022	12.0	12.3 (21E226)	iOS 15.5 (19F64)	watchOS 8.5 (19T241)	tvOS 15.4 (19L439)	
14.0	14A309	September 12, 2022	12.5	12.3 (21E226)	iOS 16.0 (20A360)	watchOS 9.0 (20R362)	tvOS 16.0 (20J373)	
14.0.1	14A400	September 26, 2022	12.5	12.3 (21E226)	iOS 16.0 (20A360)	watchOS 9.0 (20R362)	tvOS 16.0 (20J373)	
14.1	14B47b	November 1, 2022	12.5	13.0 (22A372)	iOS 16.1 (20B71)	watchOS 9.1 (20S71)	tvOS 16.1 (20K67)	
14.2	14C18	December 13, 2022	12.5	13.1 (22C55)	iOS 16.2 (20C52)	watchOS 9.1 (20S71)	tvOS 16.1 (20K67)	
14.3	14E222b	March 30, 2023	13.0	13.3 (22E245)	iOS 16.4 (20E238)	watchOS 9.4 (20T248)	tvOS 16.4 (20L489)	
14.3.1	14E300c	June 1, 2023	13.0	13.3 (22E245)	iOS 16.4 (20E238)	watchOS 9.4 (20T248)	tvOS 16.4 (20L489)	
Version	Build	Release date	min macOS to run	macOS SDK(s)	iOS SDK included	watchOS SDK included	tvOS SDK included	Notes

=== Xcode 15.0 - 16.x (since visionOS support) ===
Version history
Version	Build	Release date	min macOS to run	macOS SDK(s)	iOS SDK included	watchOS SDK included	tvOS SDK included	visionOS SDK included	Notes
15.0	15A240d	September 18, 2023	13.5	14.0 (23A334)	iOS 17.0 (21A325)	watchOS 10.0 (21R354)	tvOS 17.0 (21J351)		
15.0.1	15A507	October 18, 2023	13.5	14.0 (23A334)	iOS 17.0 (21A326)	watchOS 10.0 (21R354)	tvOS 17.0 (21J351)		
15.1	15C65	December 11, 2023	13.5	14.2 (23C53)	iOS 17.2 (21C52)	watchOS 10.2 (21S355)	tvOS 17.2 (21K354)		
15.2	15C500b	January 8, 2024	13.5	14.2 (23C53)	iOS 17.2 (21C52)	watchOS 10.2 (21S355)	tvOS 17.2 (21K354)	visionOS 1.0 (21N301)	
15.3	15E5204a	March 5, 2024	14.0	14.4 (23E5196c)	iOS 17.4 (21E212)	watchOS 10.4 (21T5202c)	tvOS 17.4 (21L5212c)	visionOS 1.1 (21O5188b)	
15.4	15F31d	May 13, 2024	14.0	14.5 (23F73)	iOS 17.5 (21F77)	watchOS 10.5 (21T569)	tvOS 17.5 (21L566)	visionOS 1.2 (21O5565d)	
16.0	16A242d	September 16, 2024	14.5	15.0 (24A336)	iOS 18.0 (22A3362)	watchOS 11.0 (22R350)	tvOS 18.0 (22J358)	visionOS 2.0 (22N331)	
16.1	16B40	October 28, 2024	14.5	15.1 (24B75)	iOS 18.1 (22B74)	watchOS 11.1 (22R574)	tvOS 18.1 (22J572)	visionOS 2.1 (22N573)	
16.2	16C5032a	December 11, 2024	14.5	15.2 (24C94)	iOS 18.2 (22C146)	watchOS 11.2 (22S97)	tvOS 18.2 (22K152)	visionOS 2.2 (22N799)	
16.3	16E140	March 31, 2025	15.2	15.4 (24E241)	iOS 18.4 (22E235)	watchOS 11.4 (22T246)	tvOS 18.4 (22L251)	visionOS 2.4 (22O233)	
16.4	16F6	May 28, 2025	15.3	15.5 (24F74)	iOS 18.5 (22F76)	watchOS 11.5 (22T572)	tvOS 18.5 (22L572)	visionOS 2.5 (22O473)	
Version	Build	Release date	min macOS to run	macOS SDK(s)	iOS SDK included	watchOS SDK included	tvOS SDK included	visionOS SDK included	Notes

=== Xcode 26.0 - 27.x (since version number change) ===
Version history
Version	Build	Release date	min macOS to run	macOS SDK(s)	iOS SDK included	watchOS SDK included	tvOS SDK included	visionOS SDK included	Notes
26.0	17A324	September 15, 2025	15.6	26.0 (25A352)	iOS 26.0 (23A337)	watchOS 26.0 (23R351)	tvOS 26.0 (23J351)	visionOS 26.0 (23M335)	
26.0.1	17A400	September 22, 2025	15.6	26.0 (25A352)	iOS 26.0 (23A337)	watchOS 26.0 (23R351)	tvOS 26.0 (23J351)	visionOS 26.0 (23M335)	
26.1	17B55	November 3, 2025	15.6	26.1 (25B74)	iOS 26.1 (23B77)	watchOS 26.1 (23S34)	tvOS 26.1 (23J576)	visionOS 26.1 (23N45)	
26.1.1	17B100	November 11, 2025	15.6	26.1 (25B74)	iOS 26.1 (23B77)	watchOS 26.1 (23S34)	tvOS 26.1 (23J576)	visionOS 26.1 (23N45)	
26.2	17C52	December 12, 2025	15.6	26.2 (25C57)	iOS 26.2 (23C53)	watchOS 26.2 (23S303)	tvOS 26.2 (23K50)	visionOS 26.2 (23N301)	
26.3	17C529	February 20, 2026	15.6	26.2 (25C58)	iOS 26.2 (23C57)	watchOS 26.2 (23S303)	tvOS 26.2 (23K50)	visionOS 26.2 (23N301)	
26.4	17E192	March 18, 2026	26.2	26.4 (25E236)	iOS 26.4 (23E237)	watchOS 26.4 (23T238)	tvOS 26.4 (23L236)	visionOS 26.4 (23O238)	
26.4.1	17E202	April 16, 2026	26.2	26.4 (25E251)	iOS 26.4 (23E252)	watchOS 26.4 (23T238)	tvOS 26.4 (23L236)	visionOS 26.4 (23O248)	
26.5	17F42	May 4, 2026	26.2	26.5 (25F70)	iOS 26.5 (23F73)	watchOS 26.5 (23T570)	tvOS 26.5 (23L470)	visionOS 26.5 (23O469)	
26.6	17F113	June 25, 2026	26.2	26.5 (25F70)	iOS 26.5 (23F81a)	watchOS 26.5 (23T570)	tvOS 26.5 (23L470)	visionOS 26.5 (23O469)	
27.0	27A266a	September 14, 2026	26.6	27.0 (26A425)	iOS 27.0 (24A430)	watchOS 27.0 (24R360)	tvOS 27.0 (24J360)	visionOS 27.0 (24M361)	
27.1	27A9275	October 15, 2026	26.6	27.0 (26A425)	iOS 27.1 (24A94232)	watchOS 27.0 (24R360)	tvOS 27.0 (24J360)	visionOS 27.0 (24M361)	
27.2	27B52	October 29, 2026	26.6	27.2 (26B118)	iOS 27.2 (24B118)	watchOS 27.2 (24S118)	tvOS 27.2 (24K122)	visionOS 27.2 (24N120)	
27.3 beta 2	27C5035i	November 16, 2026	26.6	27.3 (26C5047b)	iOS 27.3 (24C5049b)	watchOS 27.3 (24S5296b)	tvOS 27.3 (24K5298b)	visionOS 27.3 (24N5298b)	
Version	Build	Release date	min macOS to run	macOS SDK(s)	iOS SDK included	watchOS SDK included	tvOS SDK included	visionOS SDK included	Notes

== Toolchain versions ==
Discontinued	Current release	Beta

=== Xcode 1.0 - 2.x (before iOS support) ===
Toolchain version history
Xcode	cctools	ld64	GCC 3.1	GCC 3.3	GCC 4.0
1.0	495	-	1256	-	-
1.2	499	-	-	1640	-
1.5	525	-	-	1666	-
2.5	622.9	62.1	-	1819	5370
Xcode	cctools	ld64	GCC 3.1	GCC 3.3	GCC 4.0

=== Xcode 3.0 - 4.x ===
Toolchain version history
Xcode	cctools	ld64	GCC 4.0	GCC 4.2	LLVM-GCC 4.2	LLVM	Apple LLVM-Clang
3.1.4	698.1	85.2.1	5493	5577	5555	2064.3	-
3.2	750	95.2.12	5493	5646	5646	2118	-
3.2.1	750	95.2.12	5493	5646	5646	2206	-
3.2.2	773	97.2	5493	5659	5646	2207.5	1.0.2
3.2.3	782	97.14	5494	5664	5658	2326.10	1.5 (60)
3.2.4	782	97.14	5494	5664	5658	2326.10	1.5 (60)
3.2.5	782	97.17	5494	5664	5658	2333.4	1.6 (70)
3.2.6	795	97.17	5494	5666	5658	2335.6	1.7 (77) (based on LLVM 2.9svn)
4.0	800	123.2	5494	5666	5658	2335.9	2.0 (137) (based on LLVM 2.9svn)
4.0.2	?	?	5494	5666	5658	2335.9	2.0 (137) (based on LLVM 2.9svn)
4.1	806	123.2.1	-	5666	5658	2335.15.00	2.1 (163.7.1) (based on LLVM 3.0svn)
4.2	809	127.2	-	-	5658	2336.1.00	3.0 (211.10.1) (based on LLVM 3.0svn)
4.3	822	112	-	-	5658	2336.9.00	3.1 (tags/Apple/clang-318.0.45) (based on LLVM 3.1svn)
4.3.1	?	?	-	-	5658	2336.9.00	3.1 (tags/Apple/clang-318.0.54) (based on LLVM 3.1svn)
4.3.2	?	?	-	-	5658	2336.9.00	3.1 (tags/Apple/clang-318.0.58) (based on LLVM 3.1svn)
4.3.3	?	?	-	-	5658	2336.9.00	3.1 (tags/Apple/clang-318.0.61) (based on LLVM 3.1svn)
4.4	829	133.3	-	-	5658	2336.11.00	4.0 (tags/Apple/clang-421.0.57) (based on LLVM 3.1svn)
4.4.1	?	?	-	-	5658	2336.11.00	4.0 (tags/Apple/clang-421.0.60) (based on LLVM 3.1svn)
4.5	836	134.9	-	-	5658	2336.11.00	4.1 (tags/Apple/clang-421.11.65) (based on LLVM 3.1svn)
4.5.1	?	?	-	-	5658	2336.11.00	4.1 (tags/Apple/clang-421.11.66) (based on LLVM 3.1svn)
4.5.2	?	?	-	-	5658	2336.11.00	4.1 (tags/Apple/clang-421.11.66) (based on LLVM 3.1svn)
4.6	839	136	-	-	5658	2336.11.00	4.2 (clang-425.0.24) (based on LLVM 3.2svn)
4.6.1	?	?	-	-	5658	2336.11.00	4.2 (clang-425.0.27) (based on LLVM 3.2svn)
4.6.2	?	?	-	-	5658	2336.11.00	4.2 (clang-425.0.28) (based on LLVM 3.2svn)
4.6.3	?	?	-	-	5658	2336.11.00	4.2 (clang-425.0.28) (based on LLVM 3.2svn)
Xcode	cctools	ld64	GCC 4.0	GCC 4.2	LLVM-GCC 4.2	LLVM	Apple LLVM-Clang

=== Xcode 5.0 - 6.x (since arm64 support) ===
Toolchain version history
Xcode	cctools	ld64	LLVM	Clang version string	Swift version string
5.0.0	846.2.1	224.1	3.3svn	5.0 (clang-500.2.75) (based on LLVM 3.3svn)	
5.0.1	846.2.4	224.1	3.3svn	5.0 (clang-500.2.79) (based on LLVM 3.3svn)	
5.0.2	846.2.4	224.1	3.3svn	5.0 (clang-500.2.79) (based on LLVM 3.3svn)	
5.1	855	236.3	3.4svn	5.1 (clang-503.0.38) (based on LLVM 3.4svn)	
5.1.1	855	236.4	3.4svn	5.1 (clang-503.0.40) (based on LLVM 3.4svn)	
6.0.1	862	241.8	3.5svn	6.0 (clang-600.0.51) (based on LLVM 3.5svn)	1.0 (swift-600.0.51.4)
6.1	862	241.9	3.5svn	6.0 (clang-600.0.54) (based on LLVM 3.5svn)	1.1 (swift-600.0.54.20)
6.1.1	862	241.9	3.5svn	6.0 (clang-600.0.56) (based on LLVM 3.5svn)	1.1 (swift-600.0.56.1)
6.2	862	241.9	3.5svn	6.0 (clang-600.0.57) (based on LLVM 3.5svn)	1.1 (swift-600.0.57.4)
6.3	870	242	3.6.0svn	6.1.0 (clang-602.0.49) (based on LLVM 3.6.0svn)	1.2 (swiftlang-602.0.49.3)
6.3.1	870	242	3.6.0svn	6.1.0 (clang-602.0.49) (based on LLVM 3.6.0svn)	1.2 (swiftlang-602.0.49.6)
6.3.2	870	242	3.6.0svn	6.1.0 (clang-602.0.53) (based on LLVM 3.6.0svn)	1.2 (swiftlang-602.0.53.1)
6.4	870	242.2	3.6.0svn	6.1.0 (clang-602.0.53) (based on LLVM 3.6.0svn)	1.2 (swiftlang-602.0.53.1)
Xcode	cctools	ld64	LLVM	Clang version string	Swift version string

=== Xcode 7.0 - 10.x (since Free On-Device Development) ===
Toolchain version history
Xcode	cctools	ld64	LLVM	Clang version string	Swift version string
7.0	877.5	253.3	3.7.0svn	7.0.0 (clang-700.0.72)	2.0 (swiftlang-700.0.59)
7.0.1	877.5	253.3.3	3.7.0svn	7.0.0 (clang-700.0.72)	2.0 (swiftlang-700.0.59)
7.1	877.7	253.6	3.7.0svn	7.0.0 (clang-700.1.76)	2.1 (swiftlang-700.1.101.6)
7.2	877.8	253.9	3.7.0svn	7.0.2 (clang-700.1.81)	2.1.1 (swiftlang-700.1.101.15)
7.2.1	877.8	253.9	3.7.0svn	7.0.2 (clang-700.1.81)	2.1.1 (swiftlang-700.1.101.15)
7.3	886	264.3.101	3.8.0svn	7.3.0 (clang-703.0.29)	2.2 (swiftlang-703.0.18.1)
7.3.1	886	264.3.102	3.8.0svn	7.3.0 (clang-703.0.31)	2.2 (swiftlang-703.0.18.8)
8.0	895	274.1	3.9.0svn	8.0.0 (clang-800.0.38)	3.0 (swiftlang-800.0.46.2)
8.1	895	274.1	3.9.0svn	8.0.0 (clang-800.0.42.1)	3.0.1 (swiftlang-800.0.58.6 clang-800.0.42.1)
8.2	895	274.2	3.9.0svn	8.0.0 (clang-800.0.42.1)	3.0.2 (swiftlang-800.0.63 clang-800.0.42.1)
8.2.1	895	274.2	3.9.0svn	8.0.0 (clang-800.0.42.1)	3.0.2 (swiftlang-800.0.63 clang-800.0.42.1)
8.3	898	278.4	3.9.0svn	8.1.0 (clang-802.0.38)	3.1 (swiftlang-802.0.48 clang-802.0.38)
8.3.1	898	278.4	3.9.0svn	8.1.0 (clang-802.0.41)	3.1 (swiftlang-802.0.51 clang-802.0.41)
8.3.2	898	278.4	3.9.0svn	8.1.0 (clang-802.0.42)	3.1 (swiftlang-802.0.53 clang-802.0.42)
8.3.3	898	278.4	3.9.0svn	8.1.0 (clang-802.0.42)	3.1 (swiftlang-802.0.53 clang-802.0.42)
9.0	900	302.3	4.0.0	9.0.0 (clang-900.0.37)	4.0 (swiftlang-900.0.65 clang-900.0.37)
9.1	900	302.3.1	4.0.0	9.0.0 (clang-900.0.38)	4.0.2 (swiftlang-900.0.69.2 clang-900.0.38)
9.2	900	305	4.0.0	9.0.0 (clang-900.0.39.2)	4.0.3 (swiftlang-900.0.74.1 clang-900.0.39.2)
9.3	906	351.8	5.0.2	9.1.0 (clang-902.0.39.1)	4.1 (swiftlang-902.0.48 clang-902.0.37.1)
9.3.1	906	351.8	5.0.2	9.1.0 (clang-902.0.39.1)	4.1 (swiftlang-902.0.48 clang-902.0.37.1)
9.4	906	351.8	5.0.2	9.1.0 (clang-902.0.39.2)	4.1.2 (swiftlang-902.0.54 clang-902.0.39.2)
9.4.1	906	351.8	5.0.2	9.1.0 (clang-902.0.39.2)	4.1.2 (swiftlang-902.0.54 clang-902.0.39.2)
10.0	921.0.1	409.12	6.0.1	10.0.0 (clang-1000.11.45.2)	4.2 (swiftlang-1000.11.37.1 clang-1000.11.45.1)
10.1	921.0.1	409.12	6.0.1	10.0.0 (clang-1000.11.45.5)	4.2.1 (swiftlang-1000.11.42 clang-1000.11.45.1)
10.2	927.0.2	450.3	7.0.0	10.0.1 (clang-1001.0.46.3)	5.0 (swiftlang-1001.0.69.5 clang-1001.0.46.3)
10.2.1	927.0.2	450.3	7.0.0	10.0.1 (clang-1001.0.46.4)	5.0.1 (swiftlang-1001.0.82.4 clang-1001.0.46.5)
10.3	927.0.2	450.3	7.0.0	10.0.1 (clang-1001.0.46.4)	5.0.1 (swiftlang-1001.0.82.4 clang-1001.0.46.5)
Xcode	cctools	ld64	LLVM	Clang version string	Swift version string

=== Xcode 11.0 - 14.x (since SwiftUI framework) ===
Toolchain version history
Xcode	cctools	ld64	LLVM	Clang version string	Swift version string
11.0	949.0.1	512.4	8.0.0	11.0.0 (clang-1100.0.33.8)	5.1 (swiftlang-1100.0.270.13 clang-1100.0.33.7)
11.1	949.0.1	512.4	8.0.0	11.0.0 (clang-1100.0.33.8)	5.1 (swiftlang-1100.0.270.13 clang-1100.0.33.7)
11.2	949.0.1	520	8.0.0	11.0.0 (clang-1100.0.33.12)	5.1.2 (swiftlang-1100.0.278 clang-1100.0.33.9)
11.2.1	949.0.1	520	8.0.0	11.0.0 (clang-1100.0.33.12)	5.1.2 (swiftlang-1100.0.278 clang-1100.0.33.9)
11.3	949.0.1	530	8.0.0	11.0.0 (clang-1100.0.33.16)	5.1.3 (swiftlang-1100.0.282.1 clang-1100.0.33.15)
11.3.1	949.0.1	530	8.0.0	11.0.0 (clang-1100.0.33.17)	5.1.3 (swiftlang-1100.0.282.1 clang-1100.0.33.15)
11.4	959.0.1	556.5	9.0.0	11.0.3 (clang-1103.0.32.29)	5.2 (swiftlang-1103.0.32.1 clang-1103.0.32.29)
11.4.1	959.0.1	556.6	9.0.0	11.0.3 (clang-1103.0.32.59)	5.2.2 (swiftlang-1103.0.32.6 clang-1103.0.32.51)
11.5	959.0.1	556.6	9.0.0	11.0.3 (clang-1103.0.32.62)	5.2.4 (swiftlang-1103.0.32.9 clang-1103.0.32.53)
11.6	959.0.1	556.6	9.0.0	11.0.3 (clang-1103.0.32.62)	5.2.4 (swiftlang-1103.0.32.9 clang-1103.0.32.53)
11.7	959.0.1	556.6	9.0.0	11.0.3 (clang-1103.0.32.62)	5.2.4 (swiftlang-1103.0.32.9 clang-1103.0.32.53)
12.0	973.0.1	609	10.0.0	12.0.0 (clang-1200.0.32.2)	5.3 (swiftlang-1200.0.29.2 clang-1200.0.30.1)
12.0.1	973.0.1	609	10.0.0	12.0.0 (clang-1200.0.32.2)	5.3 (swiftlang-1200.0.29.2 clang-1200.0.30.1)
12.1	973.0.1	609	10.0.0	12.0.0 (clang-1200.0.32.21)	5.3 (swiftlang-1200.0.29.2 clang-1200.0.30.1)
12.1.1 RC	973.0.1	609	10.0.0	12.0.0 (clang-1200.0.32.21)	5.3 (swiftlang-1200.0.29.2 clang-1200.0.30.1)
12.2	973.4	609.7	10.0.0	12.0.0 (clang-1200.0.32.27)	5.3.1 (swiftlang-1200.0.41 clang-1200.0.32.8)
12.3	977.1	609.8	10.0.0	12.0.0 (clang-1200.0.32.28)	5.3.2 (swiftlang-1200.0.45 clang-1200.0.32.28)
12.4	977.1	609.8	10.0.0	12.0.0 (clang-1200.0.32.29)	5.3.2 (swiftlang-1200.0.45 clang-1200.0.32.28)
12.5	980	650.9	11.1.0	12.0.5 (clang-1205.0.22.9)	5.4 (swiftlang-1205.0.26.9 clang-1205.0.19.55)
12.5.1	980.1	650.9	11.1.0	12.0.5 (clang-1205.0.22.11)	5.4.2 (swiftlang-1205.0.28.2 clang-1205.0.19.57)
13.0	986	711	12.0.0	13.0.0 (clang-1300.0.29.3)	5.5 (swiftlang-1300.0.31.1 clang-1300.0.29.1)
13.1	986	711	12.0.0	13.0.0 (clang-1300.0.29.3)	5.5.1 (swiftlang-1300.0.31.4 clang-1300.0.29.6)
13.2	986	711	12.0.0	13.0.0 (clang-1300.0.29.30)	5.5.2 (swiftlang-1300.0.47.5 clang-1300.0.29.30)
13.2.1	986	711	12.0.0	13.0.0 (clang-1300.0.29.30)	5.5.2 (swiftlang-1300.0.47.5 clang-1300.0.29.30)
13.3	994.1	762	13.0.0	13.1.6 (clang-1316.0.21.2)	5.6 (swiftlang-5.6.0.323.62 clang-1316.0.20.8)
13.3.1	994.1	762	13.0.0	13.1.6 (clang-1316.0.21.2.3)	5.6 (swiftlang-5.6.0.323.62 clang-1316.0.20.8)
13.4	994.1	764	13.0.0	13.1.6 (clang-1316.0.21.2.5)	5.6.1 (swiftlang-5.6.0.323.66 clang-1316.0.20.12)
13.4.1	994.1	764	13.0.0	13.1.6 (clang-1316.0.21.2.5)	5.6.1 (swiftlang-5.6.0.323.66 clang-1316.0.20.12)
14.0	1001.2	819.6	14.0.0	14.0.0 (clang-1400.0.29.102)	5.7 (swiftlang-5.7.0.127.4 clang-1400.0.29.50)
14.0.1	1001.2	819.6	14.0.0	14.0.0 (clang-1400.0.29.102)	5.7 (swiftlang-5.7.0.127.4 clang-1400.0.29.50)
14.1	1001.2	820.1	14.0.0	14.0.0 (clang-1400.0.29.202)	5.7.1 (swiftlang-5.7.1.135.3 clang-1400.0.29.51)
14.2	1001.2	820.1	14.0.0	14.0.0 (clang-1400.0.29.202)	5.7.2 (swiftlang-5.7.2.135.5 clang-1400.0.29.51)
14.3	1005.2	857.1	15.0.0	14.0.3 (clang-1403.0.22.14.1)	5.8 (swiftlang-5.8.0.124.1 clang-1403.0.22.11.100)
14.3.1	1005.2	857.1	15.0.0	14.0.3 (clang-1403.0.22.14.1)	5.8.1 (swiftlang-5.8.0.124.5 clang-1403.0.22.11.100)
Xcode	cctools	ld64	LLVM	Clang version string	Swift version string

=== Xcode 15.0 - 16.x (since visionOS support) ===
Toolchain version history
Xcode	cctools	ld	LLVM	Clang version string	Swift version string
15.0	1009.2	1015.7	16.0.0	15.0.0 (clang-1500.0.40.1)	5.9 (swiftlang-5.9.0.128.108 clang-1500.0.40.1)
15.0.1	1009.2	1015.7	16.0.0	15.0.0 (clang-1500.0.40.1)	5.9 (swiftlang-5.9.0.128.108 clang-1500.0.40.1)
15.1	1009.3	1022.1	16.0.0	15.0.0 (clang-1500.1.0.2.5)	5.9.2 (swiftlang-5.9.2.2.56 clang-1500.1.0.2.5)
15.2	1009.3	1022.1	16.0.0	15.0.0 (clang-1500.1.0.2.5)	5.9.2 (swiftlang-5.9.2.2.56 clang-1500.1.0.2.5)
15.3	1010.6	1053.12	16.0.0	15.0.0 (clang-1500.3.9.4)	5.10 (swiftlang-5.10.0.13 clang-1500.3.9.4)
15.4	1010.6	1053.12	16.0.0	15.0.0 (clang-1500.3.9.4)	5.10 (swiftlang-5.10.0.13 clang-1500.3.9.4)
16.0	1021.4	1115.7.3	17.0.6	16.0.0 (clang-1600.0.26.3)	6.0 (swiftlang-6.0.0.9.10 clang-1600.0.26.2)
16.1	1021.4	1115.7.3	17.0.6	16.0.0 (clang-1600.0.26.4)	6.0.2 (swiftlang-6.0.2.1.2 clang-1600.0.26.4)
16.2	1022.2	1115.7.3	17.0.6	16.0.0 (clang-1600.0.26.6)	6.0.3 (swiftlang-6.0.3.1.10 clang-1600.0.30.1)
16.3	1024.3	1167.4.1	19.1.4	17.0.0 (clang-1700.0.13.3)	6.1 (swiftlang-6.1.0.110.21 clang-1700.0.13.3)
16.4	1024.3	1167.5	19.1.4	17.0.0 (clang-1700.0.13.5)	6.1.2 (swiftlang-6.1.2.1.2 clang-1700.0.13.5)
Xcode	cctools	ld	LLVM	Clang version string	Swift version string

=== Xcode 26.0 - 27.x (since version number change) ===
Toolchain version history
Xcode	cctools	ld	LLVM	Clang version string	Swift version string
26.0	1030.6.3	1221.4	19.1.5	17.0.0 (clang-1700.3.19.1)	6.2 (swiftlang-6.2.0.19.9 clang-1700.3.19.1)
26.0.1	1030.6.3	1221.4	19.1.5	17.0.0 (clang-1700.3.19.1)	6.2 (swiftlang-6.2.0.19.9 clang-1700.3.19.1)
26.1	1030.6.3	1230.1	19.1.5	17.0.0 (clang-1700.4.4.1)	6.2.1 (swiftlang-6.2.1.4.8 clang-1700.4.4.1)
26.1.1	1030.6.3	1230.1	19.1.5	17.0.0 (clang-1700.4.4.1)	6.2.1 (swiftlang-6.2.1.4.8 clang-1700.4.4.1)
26.2	1030.6.3	1230.1	19.1.5	17.0.0 (clang-1700.6.3.2)	6.2.3 (swiftlang-6.2.3.3.21 clang-1700.6.3.2)
26.3	1030.6.3	1230.1	19.1.5	17.0.0 (clang-1700.6.4.2)	6.2.4 (swiftlang-6.2.4.1.4 clang-1700.6.4.2)
26.4	1040	1266.8	21.1.6	21.0.0 (clang-2100.0.123.102)	6.3 (swiftlang-6.3.0.123.5 clang-2100.0.123.102)
26.4.1	1040	1266.8	21.1.6	21.0.0 (clang-2100.0.123.102)	6.3.1 (swiftlang-6.3.1.1.2 clang-2100.0.123.102)
26.5	1040	1267	21.1.6	21.0.0 (clang-2100.1.1.101)	6.3.2 (swiftlang-6.3.2.1.108 clang-2100.1.1.101)
26.6	1040	1267	21.1.6	21.0.0 (clang-2100.1.1.101)	6.3.3 (swiftlang-6.3.3.1.3 clang-2100.1.1.101)
27.0	1040	27037.1	21.1.6	21.0.0 (clang-2100.3.34.2)	6.4 (swiftlang-6.4.0.34.1 clang-2100.3.34.1)
27.1	1040	27037.1	21.1.6	21.0.0 (clang-2100.3.34.2)	6.4 (swiftlang-6.4.0.34.1 clang-2100.3.34.1)
27.2	1040	27106.1	21.1.6	21.0.0 (clang-2100.4.1.1)	6.4.2 (swiftlang-6.4.2.1.9 clang-2100.4.1.1)
27.3 beta 2	1040	27200	21.1.6	21.0.0 (clang-2100.5.3.3)	6.4.4 (swiftlang-6.4.4.3.6 clang-2100.5.3.3)
Xcode	cctools	ld	LLVM	Clang version string	Swift version string

== See also ==
- CodeWarrior
- List of integrated development environments
- Objective-C
- Swift (programming language)
- XcodeGhost
