= Mobile DevOps =

Mobile DevOps is a set of practices that applies the principles of DevOps specifically to the development of mobile applications. Traditional DevOps focuses on streamlining the software development process in general, but mobile development has its own unique challenges that require a tailored approach. Mobile DevOps is not simply a branch of DevOps specific to mobile app development, instead an extension and reinterpretation of the DevOps philosophy due to very specific requirements of the mobile world.

== Rationale ==
Traditional DevOps approach has been formed around 2007-2008, close to the dates when iOS and Android mobile operating systems were released to the public. The traditional DevOps approach primarily evolved to meet the changing needs of the software development world with the paradigm shift towards continuous and rapid development and deployment (such as in web development, where interpreted languages are more prevalent than compiled languages). While traditional DevOps embraced agility and flexibility, mobile operating system providers steered towards a walled-garden approach with compiled apps with tight controls over how they can be distributed and installed on a mobile device. This difference in the mobile development mindset compared to what the traditional DevOps approach is advocating, is augmented further with the mobile applications to be deployed on a high number of varying devices and operating systems.

Eventually, the concept of Mobile DevOps took off as a trend around 2014-2015, in line with the fast growth of the number of applications in mobile app stores. As individuals and corporations alike are developing and publishing more and more mobile applications, the need for efficiency and shorter release cycles increased, which is addressed by the continuous feedback and continuous development approach within the concept of DevOps, while requiring a significant level of adaptation and extension of the traditional DevOps practices.

== Mindset shift from traditional DevOps to mobile DevOps ==
Mobile DevOps presents challenges and constraints that differ from those found in other DevOps environments, and is sometimes treated as a distinct discipline.

These challenges can be outlined as follows:

- Platform-specific requirements and tight controls of mobile operating system providers, where for instance a macOS device is mandatory for iOS application development and release.
- The walled-garden approach of distributing mobile apps, specifically applying to iOS applications, which comes with app review and app release delays that would not be needed in web development, for instance.
- Code signing requirements that come with the walled-garden approach, which introduce additional processes in the mobile application build pipeline along with new security concerns.
- An entire deployment cycle is re-run even in the slightest code change due to how applications are compiled and delivered to the users.
- The final product is to be deployed to a wide variety of mobile devices worldwide, which requires extensive testing and user feedback.
- Monitoring mobile applications require additional tools and approaches to be able to get data from an application running on a mobile device while respecting user privacy.
- Frequent operating system updates by mobile platforms can require rapid adaptation of apps, introducing further complexity to the development and maintenance cycles.

== Benefits of mobile DevOps ==
Mobile DevOps is not an abstract concept and offers a range of benefits that can help improve the efficiency and effectiveness of the mobile app development process. These benefits can even be quantified by collecting the data within the mobile application development lifecycle.

The benefits can be categorized into the following areas:

- Faster Release Cycles: By automating tasks and streamlining the development process, mobile DevOps enables teams to deliver new features and updates more frequently.
- Improved Quality: Automated testing and continuous monitoring help to identify and fix bugs earlier in the development cycle, leading to higher quality apps.
- Optimized Resource Utilization: Mobile DevOps promotes optimized resource utilization by automating tasks and streamlining workflows. Furthermore, mobile DevOps practices like containerization can help to create more efficient and scalable development environments.
- Increased Agility: Mobile DevOps allows teams to be more responsive to changes in the market and user feedback.

== List of Dedicated Mobile DevOps Platforms ==
Even though it is possible to run a mobile DevOps cycle with most of the CI/CD platforms, they may require significant effort compared to non-mobile CI/CD (e.g. you need to bring your own infrastructure or it may require "reinventing the wheel" for commonly used platforms like Jenkins).

To overcome the mobile-specific challenges specified, there are certain platforms that are dedicated to the lifecycle of mobile applications. These platforms exclusively focus on DevOps processes for mobile app development and are also referred as mobile CI/CD platforms.

- Appcircle (Multiplatform | Cloud-based & On-premise)
- Visual Studio App Center (Multiplatform | Cloud-based)
- Xcode Cloud (Apple platforms only | Cloud-based)

== See also ==
- Continuous integration
- Continuous delivery
- Continuous deployment
- Mobile app development
- List of mobile app distribution platforms
- Mobile-device testing
